= Abuna Aregawi =

Syrian monk in the 6th century

Saint Abuna Aregawi
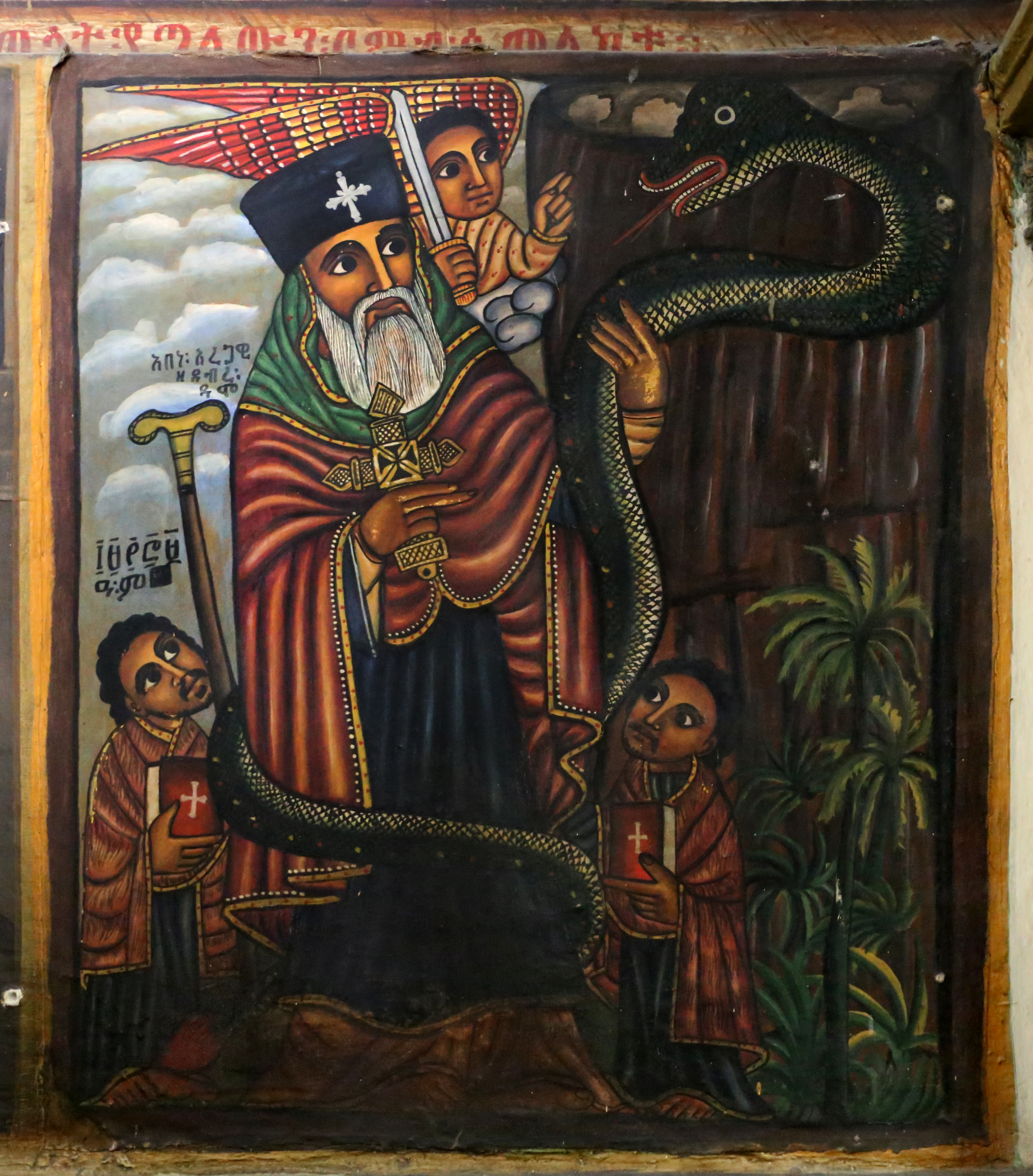
- Abuna Aragawi painting at St. George's Cathedral, Addis Ababa
- Born: c. 455 AD; Constantinople, Byzantine Empire
- Died: 6th-century Kingdom of Aksum
- Venerated in: Ethiopian Orthodox Tewahedo Church; Eritrean Orthodox Tewahedo Church
- Feast: 24–25 October (Ṭəqəmt 14 in Ethiopian calendar)

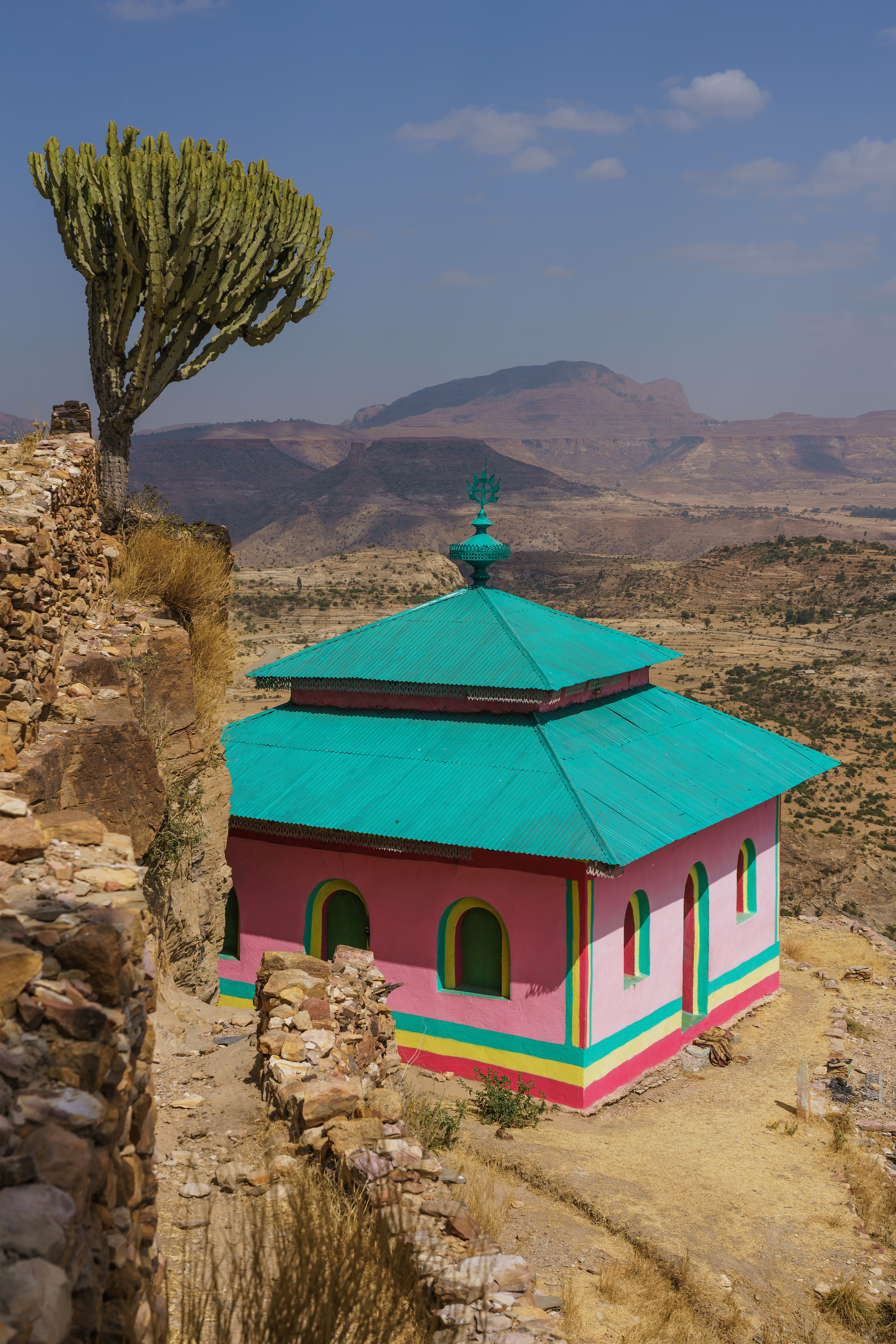
Church (known as Abuna Aregawi house) in Debre Damo monastery

Abuna Aregawi (also called Za-Mika'el Aragawi) was a sixth-century Syrian monk and canonized by the Ethiopian Orthodox Tewahedo Church, as well as by the Ethiopian Catholic Church, as well as the Eritrean Orthodox Church. He is one of the Nine Saints, who came from the Roman Empire to Ethiopia, and are credited for founding many monasteries and churches and was the main force behind installing monasticism in Ethiopia.

Tradition holds that Abuna Aregawi founded the monastery of Debre Damo in Tigray Region of Ethiopia, which is said to have been commissioned by Emperor Gebre Meskel of Axum.

== Biography ==
He is one of the Nine Saints of the Ethiopian Orthodox Church. These learned monks came from various parts of the Roman Empire to escape persecution after the Council of Chalcedon (451). Once in Ethiopia, they revitalized Christianity in Ethiopia, and to whom the Ge'ez version of the New Testament is attributed. Besides Abba Aregawi, the Nine Saints included Abba Aftsé, Abba 'Aléf, Abba Gärima, Abba Guba, Abba Liqanos, Abba Pantelewon, Abba Sehma, and Abba Yäm'ata (Yemata).

Aregawi was a disciple of the famous Coptic monk Pachomius the Great who is regarded a founder as Cenobitic Monasticism.

After spending twelve years at the court of king Ella Amida of Axum, he set out with his companion, the nun Edna, to found Debre Damo. Later in his life, king Kaleb is said to have sought his advice before setting out to south Arabia against the Jewish king Dhu Nuwas.

== Debre Demo monastery ==
According to legend, God provided a large snake to aid Aregawi in climbing the amba, or steep-sided mountain, so he could build Debre Damo in Tigray. As David Buxton recounts the story, "when Abba Aragawi, the founder of the monastery, came to the foot of the cliff a great serpent appeared. As Michael the Archangel stood by to give directions, the serpent folded Abba Aregawi in his coils and drew him to the top of the mountain."

The monastery is built with curved wood panels, painted ceilings and walls dedicated to the legend of Abuna Aregawi. Many books have been written there and distributed to churches throughout Ethiopia. There are a collection of some of the best manuscripts presently existing in Ethiopia.

His feast day is on Ṭəqəmt 14 in the Ethiopian calendar (24 or 25 October in Gregorian calendar).
