= Arwe =

Serpent-king in medieval Ethiopian mythology

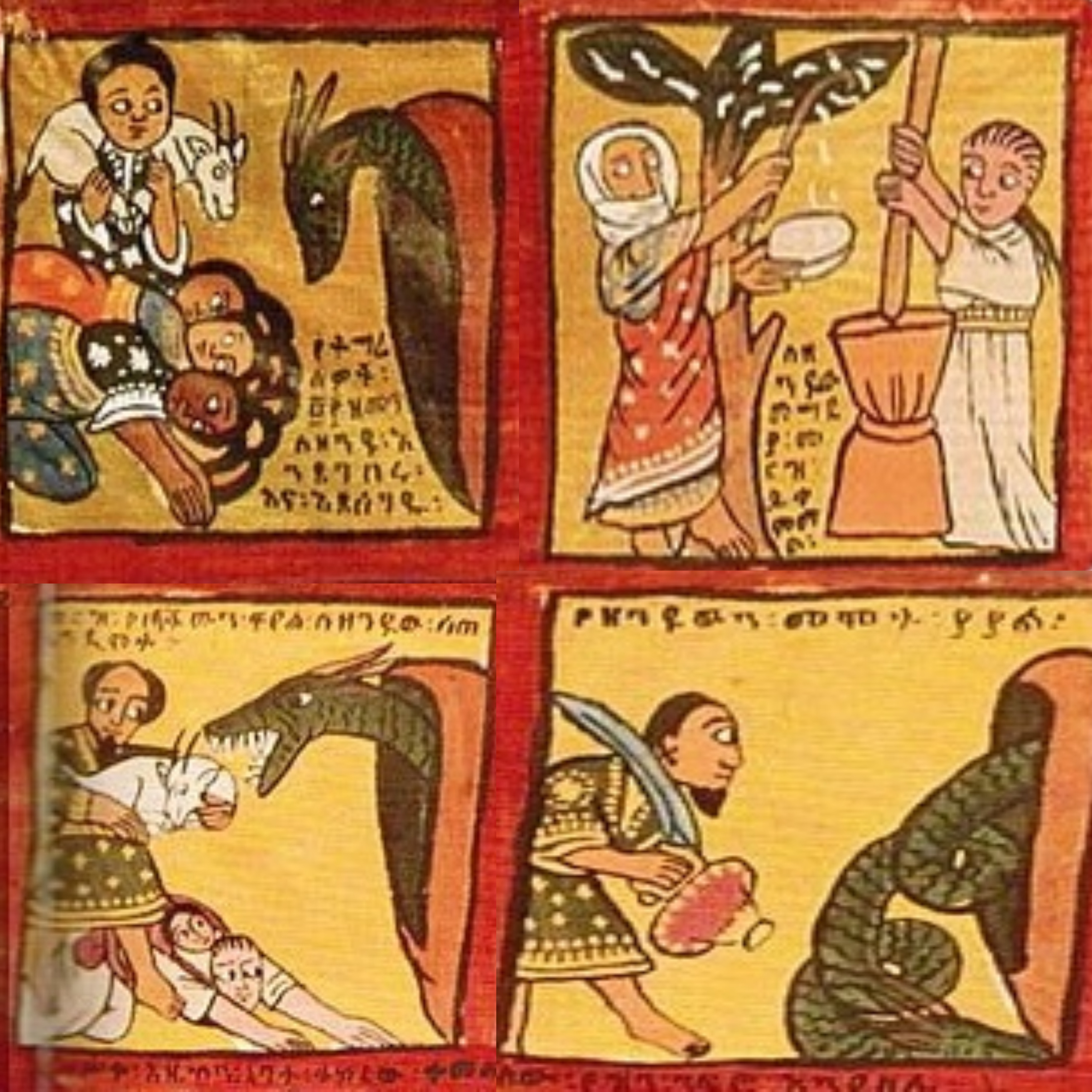
Four panels illustrating the Arwe account from a larger painting by an anonymous Ethiopian painter, 17th-19th c.: 1. Arwe demanding sacrifice; 2. Poison is extracted from the tree; 3. Arwe is offered a white goat; 4. Arwe dies.

Arwe (vocalized Ge'ez: አርዌ, romanized: 'ärwe), also known as Wainaba, in Ethiopian mythology, is a serpent-king who ruled for four hundred years before being murdered by the founder of the Solomonic dynasty. His story comes in a number of versions, all of which have him as a tyrannical ruler who demands sacrifice. The myth is part of a wider tradition of serpent- or dragon-kings, such as the Babylonian dragon.

== General outline ==
The veneration of Arwe, which was widespread, predates Christianity in Ethiopia, which became a state religion under Ezana of Axum in the early 4th century. Arwe ("wild beast" in Geʽez) is a snake-king who rules for four hundred years over the land that is to become Ethiopia. He is a giant serpent ("No, Arwe is not beyond the hill, for the hill you see is Arwe") to whom humans must sacrifice their virgin daughters and cattle to calm his endless hunger. He reigns with terror until he is defeated by a man who becomes the next ruler of the land, and his daughter becomes the Queen of Sheba, and then the mother of Menelik I.

It is believed by some Ethiopians that Arwe, or Wainaba, ruled after Aksumawi, who is the great-grandson of Noah and son of Itiopis according to the Book of Aksum. Itiopis, who was seventh in the ancestral lines, is also believed to be the twelfth direct descendant of Adam. Agazi, the progenitor of the eponymous dynasty, is instead said to have slain the serpent in the 1922 regnal list of Ethiopia. Saint Tekle Haymanot is said to have stopped worship of the serpent while proselytizing in the region of Sayint, showing the enduring influence of polytheistic Ethio-Semitic culture in a largely Tewahedo Christian and Muslim population. Arwe was a name given to Badlay ibn Sa'ad ad-Din who would invade Ethiopia before being slain by Atse Zara Yaqob at the Battle of Gomit.

== Variations ==
In one version of Arwe's myth, a stranger comes to the land where Arwe reigns and after seeing a woman cry over the fact that she has to give her daughter in sacrifice to the serpent, the man offers to kill the serpent. He requests the woman to provide him with a spotless white lamb and a bowl with juice from the poisonous Euphorbia tree. He faces the serpent and offers him the lamb and the juice, which Arwe accepts not knowing it will be the cause of his death. After Arwe is finally defeated, the people offer the man to become their ruler, a position he gladly accepts until he is ready to let his daughter Makeda reign. She becomes the Queen of Sheba, and its capital city is Axum. Some versions of the tale state that the man who killed Arwe was named Agabos.

In another version of this myth, Wainaba, the serpent ruler, is on his way traveling north from the district Tamben to Aksum when a man called Angabo promises the Aksumites to kill the serpent in exchange for the throne. He applied various forms of magic to the road the serpent traveled on, including an iron instrument that he buried under the road. He attacked Wainaba with fire, and burns him to death. Legend has it he was buried in May Wayno, where his grave still is.

=== The serpent and the saints ===
Some versions of the myth clearly combine pre-Christian and Christian elements, in order to make Christianity (specifically the Nine Saints) victorious over a pagan monster. One of these is found among tribes in the north and published by Enno Littmann in 1904: the Tigre people worship a dragon; families sacrifice their oldest daughter as well as mead and milk. When it's the turn of Eteye Azeb ("Queen of the South"), a family's oldest child, she is tied to a tree for the dragon to take, but seven saints sit down in the tree's shade. They wonder if she is Mary but she explains she is a human, to be sacrificed. When the dragon comes, two of the saints hesitate but the third, Abba Mentelit, attacks him and then all seven kill the dragon with a cross. Some blood from the dragon lands on the girl's heel, which becomes like the heel of an ass. When she returns to her village, her people send her away because they think she ran away, but the next day she shows them the body, whereupon they make her the leader of the village, and she has a maiden appointed as her second. Her deformity is cured when she visits Solomon with her second, both disguised as men. He tricks them both, and has sex with them; her son is Menelek. This version was written down in 1902, and had been retold by a Tigre man from a village north of Keren, Eritrea.

Littmann notes the ubiquity of the dragon in various mythologies of (what he then called) the Semitic peoples, including that of the Babylonian dragon, and especially among the people of Ethiopia. Many Ethiopic sources place "King Arwe" at the beginning of history. The Tigre variant, with its seven saints (originally they were the nine saints who missionized in Ethiopia in the 5th century), thus add a Christian turn to a pre-Christian tradition, and the Christian saints deliver the world from a great evil. Littmann identifies the saint Mentelit with Abba Pantelewon. Other instances of the nine saints killing the dragon are found in a hymn to Abuna Aregawi, and a very detailed version is found in a homily of Abba Garima.
