= Christian monasticism in Ethiopia =

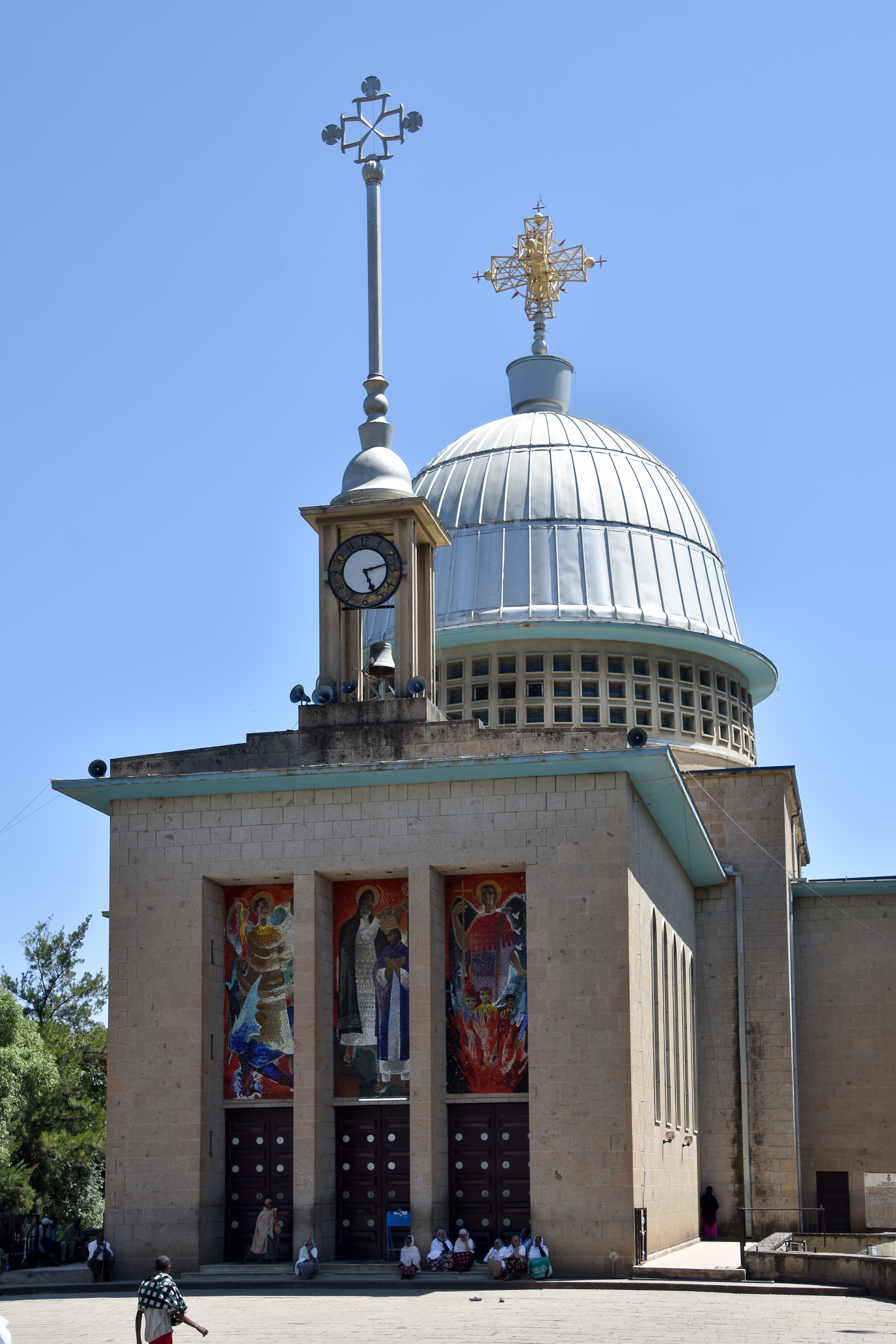
Debre Libanos monastery, located in North Shewa Zone, Oromia Region

Christian monasticism has been practiced in Ethiopia since the Aksumite era in the 6th century AD. The Nine Saints, who came from the Byzantine Empire, played a crucial role in the development of monasticism in Ethiopia, which continued to grow during the Zagwe and Solomonic periods.

Debre Libanos and Debre Damo are among the best-known monasteries in Ethiopia. Monasteries in Ethiopia often bear the titles Debre ("mountain") and Gedam ("monastery"). As in Debre Tabor or 'Debre Markios' in Ethiopia.

== Overview ==
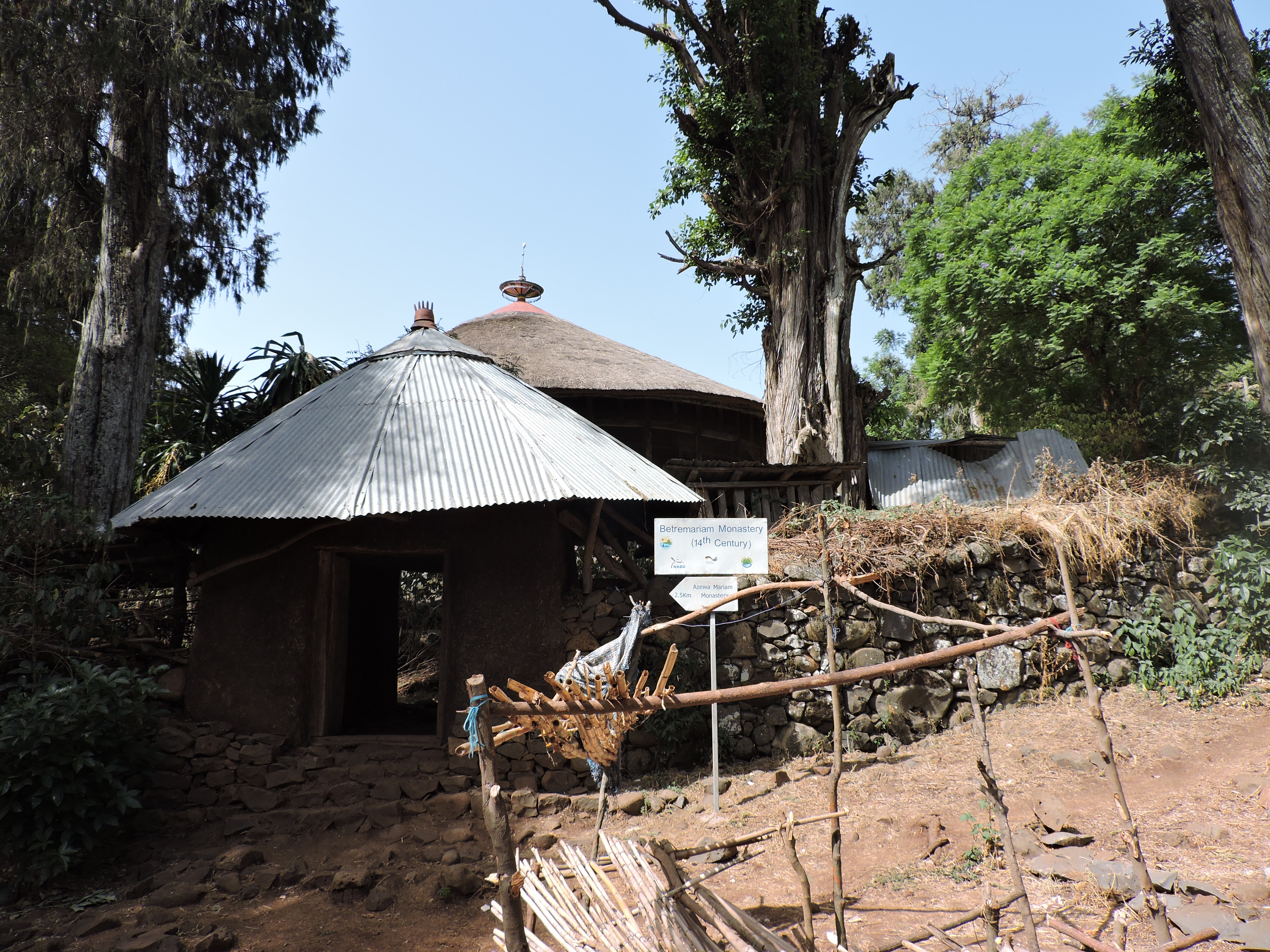
Betremariam Monastery, at the Lake Tana

Since tabots are associated with angels, Ethiopian monks are regarded as messengers of God. This concept transcends traditional theosis and is seen as a form of physical transformation. In terms of gender, monks make up the majority of the Ethiopian clergy, with estimates suggesting that they account for 10% to 20% of the population, particularly among men, who constitute 80% of Ethiopia's monastics. Every monastery also has a substantial number of nuns. Nuns generally do not emphasize gender differences by assigning superiority to either men or women; they believe that "God does not distinguish between male and female" and view monastic life as a "mimesis of the life of Christ."

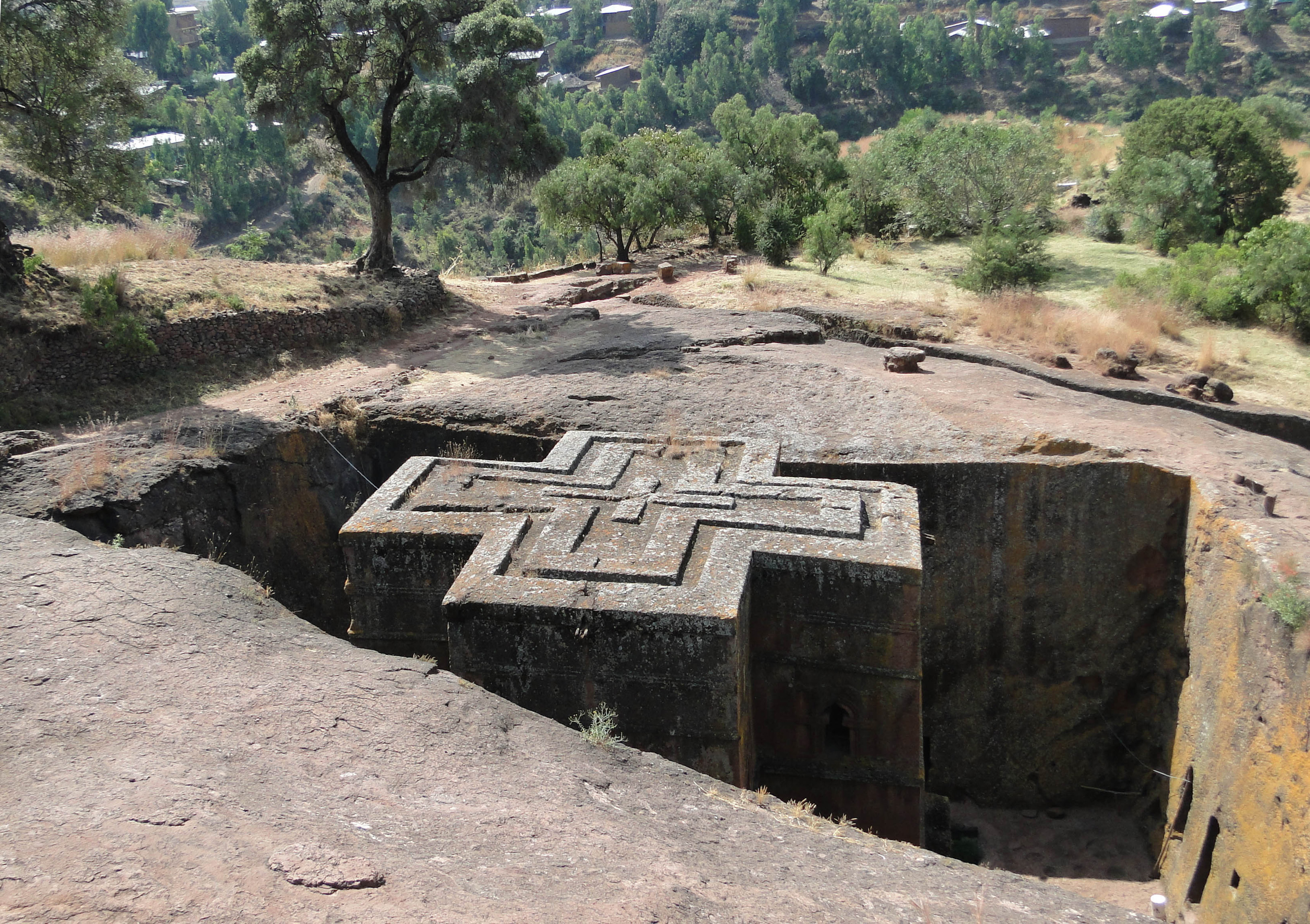
Bete Giyorgis rock-hewn church in Lalibela

Monasteries in Ethiopia are typically not built within enclosed or fortified structures and are often situated in mountainous regions. Notable examples include Debre Damo, Debre Libanos, and the monasteries on the islands of Lake Tana. It can be challenging to distinguish Ethiopian monasteries from larger, more visibly "bounded" cenobitic (communal) sites like Debre Damo and Debre Libanos. In general, Ethiopian churches are associated with monasteries, as they carry the "Debre" or "Gedam" title and are part of a community of monks and nuns.

In Addis Ababa, Orthodox Christians support the media promotion of religion, though there is debate on how to appropriately promote asceticism, humility, and devotion to God while avoiding the risk of fostering pride.

== Historical context ==
=== Kingdom of Aksum ===
Ethiopian monasteries have played vital sociocultural and economic roles within Christian society in the Ethiopian Highlands. The concept of Christian monasticism in Ethiopia dates back to the Kingdom of Aksum, around the 6th century AD, founded by a group of missionaries known as the Nine Saints. Early Ethiopian monasticism was similar to that of neighboring regions such as Egypt, Nubia, and the Levant. As in Egypt, it is unlikely that monasteries in Ethiopia played an active role in the Christianization of the local population.

According to mainstream historical records, Christianity reached the Axumite Empire during the reign of King Ezana in 330, although traditional accounts differ regarding the introduction of Christianity during the early Church period. Christianity persisted through the Early Middle Ages, and many large church buildings were constructed in the northern provinces of Ethiopia, followed by rapid changes in material culture (e.g., coinage and funerary traditions).

Christianity also survived the decline of the Kingdom of Aksum in the seventh century and continued through the Dark Age, when written records began to overshadow external sources. The fall of Aksum is attributed to two main factors: first, the anonymity of its rulers and their diminished size and status due to a decentralized structure, as highlighted in The History of the Patriarchs of Alexandria. The second factor is that most accounts came from Arab writers, often travelers, who focused extensively on the economic status of the period.

=== Zagwe dynasty ===
The Zagwe dynasty, which succeeded the Axumite dynasty, reinvigorated Christendom by founding its capital, Roha, in the 12th century, later renaming it Lalibela after the eponymous king. During the reign of King Gebre Meskel Lalibela, eleven rock-hewn churches were constructed within the town, and additional churches were built in caves in the countryside surrounding Lalibela.

However, historical records from this period became even more obscure than those from the Aksumite era. The Gadlat (hagiographies) were the primary sources for descriptions of notable kings and saints, but they were written after the events they describe. Oral history, however, offers a different perspective, particularly in relation to the archaeological work at Lalibela.

=== Solomonic period ===
Monasteries became central to social and economic life during the Solomonic period, starting with the ascension of Yekuno Amlak (r. 1270–1285). They provided charismatic religious leaders such as Abune Tekle Haymanot (1215–1313) and Iyasus Mo'a (1214–1294). Monasteries attracted royal patronage and became important centers of wealth within the political elite, where secular power was vested in the Emperor of Ethiopia and his court, as well as in the feudal system.

Until the Ethiopian Revolution in 1974, monasticism played a crucial role in the economy and agriculture of the highlands, particularly through the use of the gult system. After the abolition of the monarchy in 1975, monasteries were nationalized under the Derg regime, which significantly diminished their power.
