= Garima Gospels =

Early illuminated Christian manuscripts

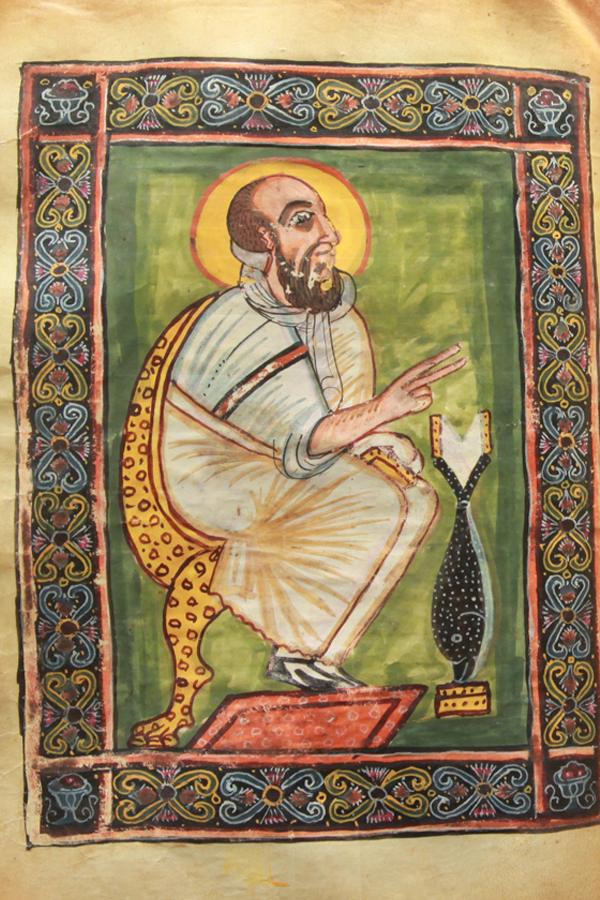
Evangelist portrait of Mark from Garima 2, likely the earlier of the two Garima Gospels

The Garima Gospels are three ancient Geʽez manuscripts containing all four canonical Gospel Books, as well as some supplementary material like lists of Gospel chapters. Garima 2, the earliest, is believed to be the earliest surviving complete illuminated Christian manuscript. Monastic tradition holds that the first two were composed close to the year 500, a date supported by recent radiocarbon analysis; samples from Garima 2 proposed a date of c. 390–570, while counterpart dating of samples from Garima 1 proposed a date of c. 530–660. The third manuscript is thought to date to a later period. The artwork in the manuscripts of the Garima Gospels also demonstrates their affinity to Christian artwork in late antique Coptic Egypt, Nubia, and Himyar (Yemen).

Together, the manuscripts provide the major witness to the Ethiopic version of the Gospels and have been applied as proof texts for the creation of critical editions of the Ethiopic Gospels by Rochus Zuurmond (Gospel of Mark, 1989; Gospel of Matthew, 2001) and Michael G. Wechsler (Gospel of John, 2005). As such, they represent amongst the earliest versional witnesses to the early Byzantine text-type of the Gospels, and are the oldest surviving Ethiopian manuscripts of any kind known to modern scholars. Western scholarship had previously believed both gospels to date from c. 1100 or later on the basis of palaeographic analysis. (Note: The Quedlinburg Itala fragment is dated to the 420s to 430s.)

The Gospels are housed in Ethiopia's Abba Garima Monastery. They are not known ever to have left the monastery; although, as the surrounding area was occupied by Muslims from the ninth to the fourteenth centuries, it is possible that they may have remained hidden in a cave for centuries, and then been rediscovered. The Gospels were included in the catalog of an American museum exhibition that toured from 1993 to 1996, African Zion: the Sacred Art of Ethiopia, but were never actually lent to the exhibition.

The Garima Gospels were created at a time when many translations were being made of texts into Geʽez for the purposes of Christian religion and worship. Other examples of this from roughly the same time period include the texts represented in the Aksumite Collection.

== Tradition ==
Monastic tradition ascribes the gospel books to Saint Abba Garima, said to have arrived in Ethiopia in 494. Abba Garima is one of the Nine Saints traditionally said to have come from Rome, and to have Christianized the rural populations of the ancient Ethiopian kingdom of Axum in the sixth century; and the monks regard the Gospels less as significant antiquities than as sacred relics of Abba Garima. According to tradition, Abba Garima wrote and illustrated the complete Gospels in a single day: God stopped the sun from setting until the Saint completed his work. Definitive radiocarbon tests have indeed supported the dating of Abba Garima 2, the earlier of the two books, to the sixth century, but otherwise recent research tends to contra-indicate many aspects of the traditional account, proposing instead that the text-base for the Garima gospels is Greek, not Syriac, that the iconography and palaeography look to Egyptian not Syrian sources, and that the gospel translation witnessed in the Garima gospels had been completed over a century before the traditional dates for the Nine Saints. Furthermore, the supposed Syrian origin of the Nine Saints is no longer maintained in most recent scholarship.

== Manuscripts ==
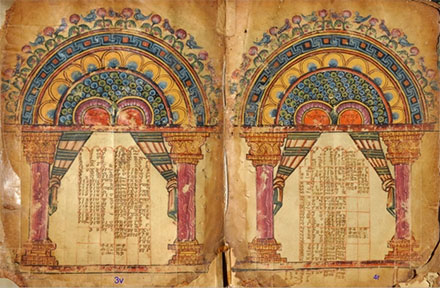
Two pages with illuminated Eusebian Canons from Garima 1, likely the later of the two Garima Gospels

There are two manuscripts, Garima 1 and Garima 2, of which Garima 2 is likely to be the earlier. In older reference works, Garima 1 is designated Garima I, while Garima 2 is designated Garima III. Before recent restoration, a third, probably 14th century, gospel book had been bound with Garima 2, and this later gospel was then denoted Garima II. Recent restoration has separated the three books, and repaginated in the original order and volumes; relocating a number of folios and miniatures which over the centuries had been displaced between the three manuscripts.

Garima 1 has 348 surviving pages, opening with eleven illuminated canon tables in arcades, followed by the Gospel texts in Geʽez; the Ethiopic language of the Kingdom of Axum from the 4th to the 7th centuries, which became and remains the religious language of the Ethiopian Church. Garima 2, also in Geʽez, is a 322-page folio written by a different scribe. It has seventeen illuminated pages, including four fine Evangelist portraits preceding their respective gospels, and a separate portrait of Eusebius of Caesarea preceding his canon tables. The portraits of Matthew, Luke and John are all presented frontally and scarcely differentiated; but that of Mark presents him in profile on the episcopal throne of Alexandria. A further illuminated page depicts the Temple of Solomon, or perhaps the Fountain of Life, with a staircase of unusual form unique in Christian iconography.

The miniatures are in a broadly Byzantine style, and are stylistically consistent with a sixth-century date. While the text was certainly written in Ethiopia, some scholars such as Marilyn Heldman, had maintained that the illuminated pages might have been imported ready-made from ancient Syria or Egypt; whereas Jacques Mercier now argues that both text and illuminations were produced within Ethiopia.

The texts of the two manuscripts differ such that Garima 1 does not appear to descend directly from Garima 2, implying that the common translation from which they derive is likely to be substantially earlier still; and that consequently the Ethiopian Gospel translation may be older than previously believed.

Neither manuscript has a colophon. However, in Garima II (the 14th century gospel book formerly bound with Garima 2) there is a historical note on two intruded leaves at the end of the Gospel of Luke, referring to the repair of churches undertaken by a King Armeho. Armeho may be identified with the King Armah of Axum, who issued coins between 600 and 640. Getatchew Haile, in translating the notes of the manuscripts, leaves open the possibility that this note may be attributed to the period of the king's reign.

The two front covers are also very old; that of Garima 1 possibly contemporary with the manuscript, which would probably make it the oldest book cover still attached to its book in the world (the 7th century St Cuthbert Gospel is the oldest European one). It is in gilt-copper with a wooden backing boards and its decoration centres on a large cross. Holes that may have been settings for gems are now empty. The cover for Garima 2 is silver and from the 10th to 12th centuries.

A 19th-century church for female pilgrims at the edge of the monastery is being renovated to house the precious manuscripts. It has small windows, which will help prevent fading. Steel bars are being inserted and the building will be protected by armed guards.

== Expert opinion ==
The Garima Gospels first became known outside Ethiopia in 1950, when Beatrice Playne, a British art historian, visited the monastery. Since women are not allowed inside the monastery, the monks courteously carried several manuscripts outside for her to view. She wrote that, "there were several illuminated manuscripts whose ornamental headings struck me as Syrian in style." In the 1960s Frenchman Jules Leroy examined the manuscripts and proposed that they dated from c. 1100. Until recently, few other outside scholars had seen the manuscripts.

The two Garima Gospels became known to biblical scholars through microfilm photographs collected by Donald M Davies who realised that they represented a much earlier text than that of any other surviving Ethiopian manuscript. He dated all three Garima gospel books (including Garima III then bound with Garima 2) to the 8th-10th centuries. Following Davies, and using his photographs, the Garima Gospels formed the base text used by Rochus Zuurmond in his preparation of a critical text for the Ethiopic Gospels; choosing Garima 1 as his primary proof text. Garima 1 and Garima 2 form together Zuurmond's class 'Aa' text or Versio Antiqua, which he states as being "a type which might be more or less the original", in that no later Ethiopic manuscript could be envisaged as conveying substantial information about the original translation except in those passages where neither Garima text survives or is readable. Zuurmond dated all three Garima gospel books later than Davies had done "In my opinion they cannot be safely dated later than the 13th century, but are probably one or two centuries earlier". In categorising the text witnessed in Garima 1 and Garima 2, Zuurmond states that it has the characteristics of a "free translation" retaining idiomatic Geʽez syntax and grammar; while often betraying a limited expertise in Greek grammar, vocabulary and orthography. Later Ethiopic manuscripts (and following them, all previous printed Ethiopic editions) commonly descend from an extensive revision undertaken in the 13th century, by which the Gospel texts were corrected to convey more literal and accurate renderings of Greek word order and terminology, and also to conform more closely to Egyptian Arabic versions. Stripping away these later changes, Zuurmond classifies the Garima texts as "early Byzantine"; while emphasising that, especially in the Gospel of John, its readings often appear to witness a version of the Byzantine Text that differs from the later Majority Text; "In about half my sample cases [in John] Eth goes against the Ethiopic equivalent of the Greek Majority Text".

Jacques Mercier a French expert in Ethiopian art, examined the manuscripts at the monastery; and, because the manuscripts were deteriorating to the point where they crumbled every time they were examined, he was permitted in 2000 to take two small detached fragments of parchment to the Oxford University Research Laboratory for Archaeology. One sample from an evangelist page in Garima 2 was dated to 330–540; and the other, from a different canon table page but not definitely a different manuscript, to 430–650. Based on stylistic aspects of the work, Mercier then estimated that the two gospels dated from c. 600. This accords with the date proposed by Marilyn Heldman in the catalog to the 1993 Exhibition African Zion: the Sacred Art of Ethiopia. Marilyn Heldman had previously contributed notes on the illuminated pages of Garima 1 and Garima 2 to Donald Davies's study of dating Ethiopic manuscripts, in which she had argued that the correct depiction of classical architectural forms in the Garima canon tables precluded a date later than the sixth century; while the nearest parallels to the evangelist portraits (especially the forms of furniture depicted in the portrait of Mark) were also of that century.

Mercier's proposal of a much earlier date for the Garima Gospels was taken into account in the revision of Zuurmond's work undertaken by Curt Niccum in 2013. Niccum accepts Mercier's carbon-dating of the Garima Gospels to the sixth century, noting that this is consistent with the observation by Michael Knibb that the text of surviving 'Kaleb' Geʽez Gospel inscriptions dating from around 525 conform with the form of text in the Garima Gospels, rather than with that found in later Ethiopic manuscripts and editions. He concludes that "more and more evidence points to a considerably earlier period of translation"; arguing that most of the work of translating the New Testament into Geʽez must have been completed in Axum before the end of the fourth century. In particular. Niccum noted the recent identification in surviving manuscripts of the Aksumite Collection of church canons and patristic extracts, whose translation into Geʽez can be confidently dated to the fifth century; and which presupposes the Gospels in a Geʽez version.

In November 2013, a two-day conference was held at the Ioannou Centre for Classical and Byzantine Studies at Oxford, sponsored by the Ethiopian Heritage Fund, with the title "Ethiopia and the Mediterranean World in Late Antiquity: The Garima Gospels in Context". During restoration work further sample fragments had been collected under controlled conditions from text and illustrated pages of both manuscripts; as a result, Jacques Mercier was able to report definitive radio-carbon datings of the two Garima Gospels; 390 to 570 for Garima 2, and 530 to 660 for Garima 1. These dating ranges would suggest that the Garima 2 manuscript is highly likely to be earlier than the Syriac illustrated Rabbula Gospels now in the collection of the Laurentian Library in Florence, Italy and explicitly dated to 586. Mercier proposed the Cotton Genesis, Vienna Genesis and Rossano Gospels as comparable (though undated) illuminated manuscripts. Otherwise papers presented at the conference included the first full published translation by Getatchew Haile of the various historical notes found in the two gospel books; together with various iconographic and palaeographic studies, including a paper from Jacques Mercier arguing that the common grid of scored lines underlying both illustrations and text demonstrates that both were executed in Ethiopia, and that consequently a school of painting and a workshop for the production of manuscripts must have been active in the Kingdom of Axum in Late Antiquity. Alessandro Bausi presented a paper comparing the Geʽez language and palaeography of the Garima gospels with those found in a recently identified manuscript witness to the 'Aksumite Collection' or 'Synod of Qefrya'; an edited compendium of selected Greek synodical texts, which is believed to have been translated into Geʽez in the later fifth century.

== Translations ==
In 2016, a translation of most of the donation notes in the manuscripts was published.

The Discourse on the Harmony of the Gospels by Pseudo-Ammonius of Alexandria, preserved in both manuscripts Abba Garima B and in Abba Garima C was translated by Francis Watson in appendix 2 of the 2016 book The Garima Gospels.

Another text contained in these manuscripts, the Letter to Carpentius by Eusebius was translated in the same volume.

A few improvements in the translations of the aforementioned texts was suggested by Sergey Kim in 2022.

== See also ==
- Aksumite Collection
- Bible translations into Geʽez
- Purple parchment
