= Abba Guba =

Ethiopian Orthodox Christian saint

Saint Guba

Abba
- Born: 5th century Cilicia
- Residence: Ethiopia
- Died: 6th century Ethiopia
- Venerated in: Ethiopian Orthodox Tewahedo Church, Eritrean Orthodox Tewahedo Church
- Feast: June 5

Abba Guba was one of the Nine Saints of Ethiopia. He is known as a healer who founded a monastery in Madara, Ethiopia.

Abba Guba probably originated from Cilicia. He was a monk with Abba Päntäléwon. After his time with Abba Pantalewon, he moved to the desert of Bäräka.

His feast day is on 29 Genbot (5 June).
