= Abba Aftse =

Ethiopian Orthodox Christian saint

Saint Aftse

Abba
- Born: 5th century
- Residence: Ethiopia
- Died: 6th century Ethiopia
- Venerated in: Ethiopian Orthodox Tewahedo Church, Eritrean Orthodox Tewahedo Church
- Feast: June 5
- Attributes: Healer

Abba Aftse or ‘Afsé (probably fl. late 400s and early 500s A.D.) was one of the Nine Saints of Ethiopia.

As he has a Syriac name, he likely came from Edessa or its surroundings. According to a gädl (Acts or Vita) of him, he traveled from Asia Minor to Rome. In Rome, he met Abba Garima. The two both traveled to Ethiopia, where they spent much of their time together as mutual companions.

Abba Aftse was known as a healer. He founded a monastery in Yeha.

His feast day is on 29 Genbot (5 June).
