= Abuna Yemata Guh =

Church in Tigray Region, Ethiopia

Coordinates: 13.9152603°N 39.343071°E

Abuna Yem'ata Guh
- ኣቡና የማታ ጉሕ
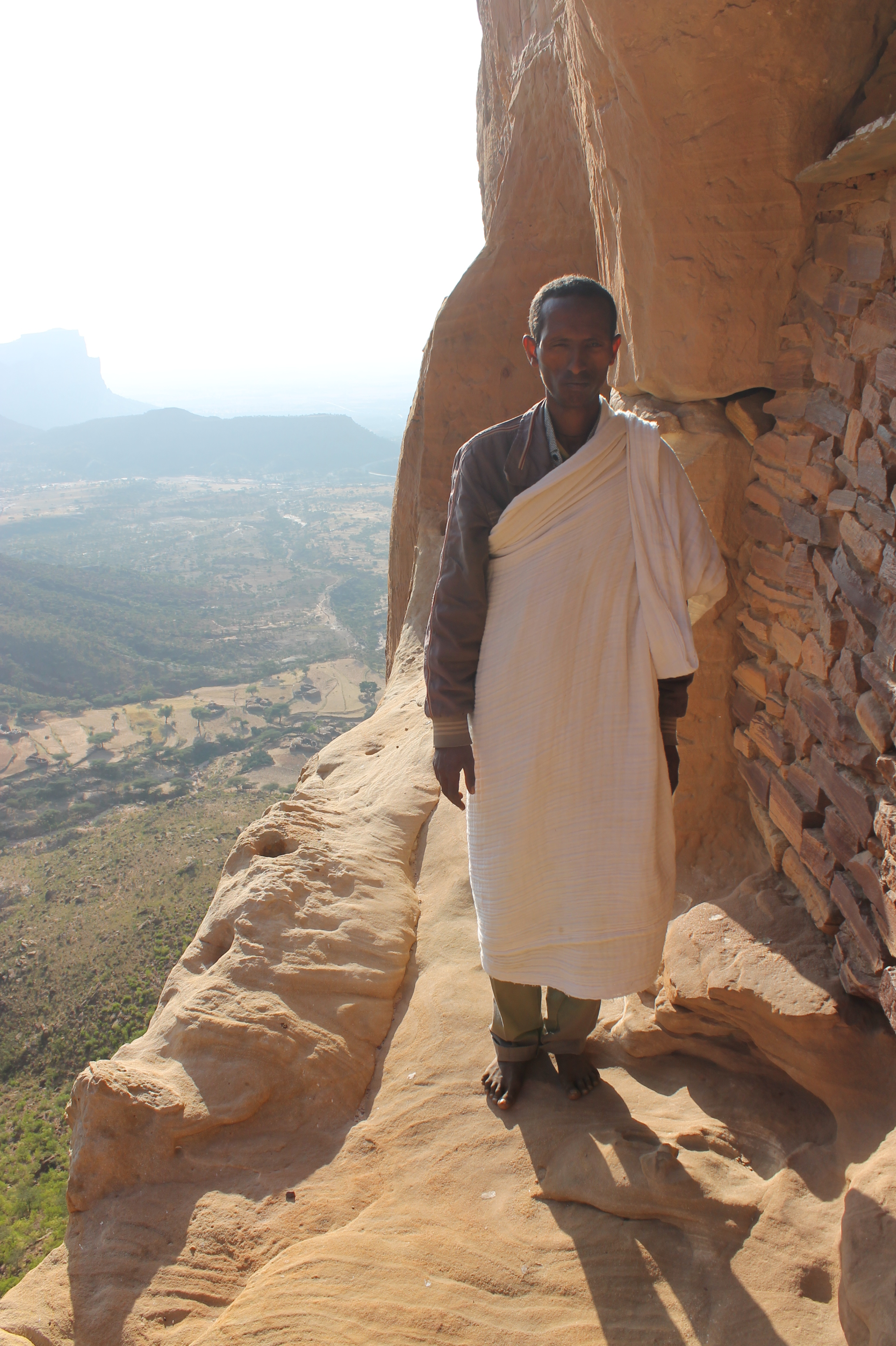
- Monk standing in front of Abuna Yemata Guh's entrance

- Location within Ethiopia
- Country: Ethiopia
- Denomination: Ethiopian Orthodox

History
- Status: Church
- Dedication: Saint Abba Yem'ata

Architecture
- Functional status: Active
- Architectural type: Chapel
- Style: Monolithic

Specifications
- Materials: Sandstone

Abuna Yemata Guh is a monolithic church located in the Hawzen woreda of the Tigray Region, Ethiopia. It is situated at an altitude above sea level of 2,580 metres (8,460 ft), or about 200 meters above the surrounding terrain, and it has to be climbed on foot to reach. It is notable for its spectacular location, its architecture and dome dating back to the sixth century, and its 15th century wall paintings.

== About ==
The church is one of the "35-odd rock-hewn churches [comprising] the largest concentration anywhere in Ethiopia." It is situated in the erstwhile Gar'alta district (woreda). The entrance is reached by a steep and hazardous ascent with hand and footholds in the rock. Visitors have to cross a natural stone bridge with a sheer drop of approximately 250 m (820 ft) on either side, and thereafter a final narrow wooden footbridge. The standing pillars are made up of Enticho and Adigrat Sandstones, which are the last erosional remnants of a sandstone formation that once covered the Precambrian basement. Although Abuna Yemata Guh is the most inaccessible place of worship in the world, priests have not recorded deaths from the climb.

== History ==
According to a local legend, the church was hewn during the sixth century, and dedicated to Abuna Yemata (also referred to as Abba Yem'ata), one of the Nine Saints. The Nine Saints are traditionally believed to have originated from Rome, Constantinople, and Syria between the end of the fifth and beginning of the sixth centuries.

== Paintings in the church ==
Owing to the dry climate of the church, the paintings on the walls and domes of the church are well-preserved. The design of the traceries in the church replicates those found in nearby churches of Gher'alta, such as Debre Tsion church (which houses more paintings depicting figures from the Old Testament than from the New Testament). The text found in these paintings is written in Ge'ez.

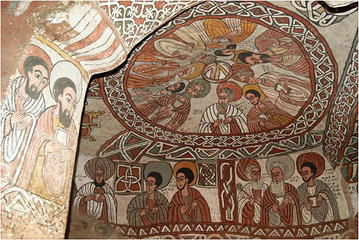
The paintings depicting the Apostles on the cupolas, and Moses, Paul, Peter and Thomas among others on the walls.

The paintings, themed around the nine saints and twelve apostles, includes icons that are in the form of diptychs and triptychs, are by tradition said to date back to the sixth century, although scholars have placed their creation to the latter half of the 15th century. A 2016 study analyzing the paintings using X-ray fluorescence broadly supports the 15th century date, showing that most of the pigments used were sourced locally and that no underlying layer of paint existed, with the exception of the painting of Mary, where evidence of retouching was identified.

== Gallery ==
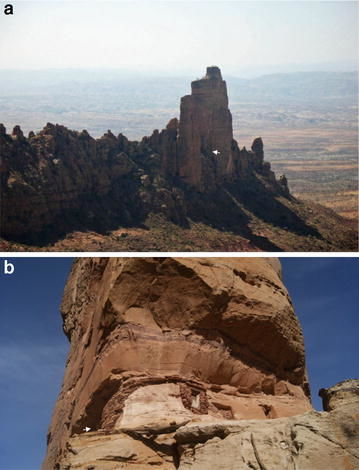
View of the church atop sandstone hill

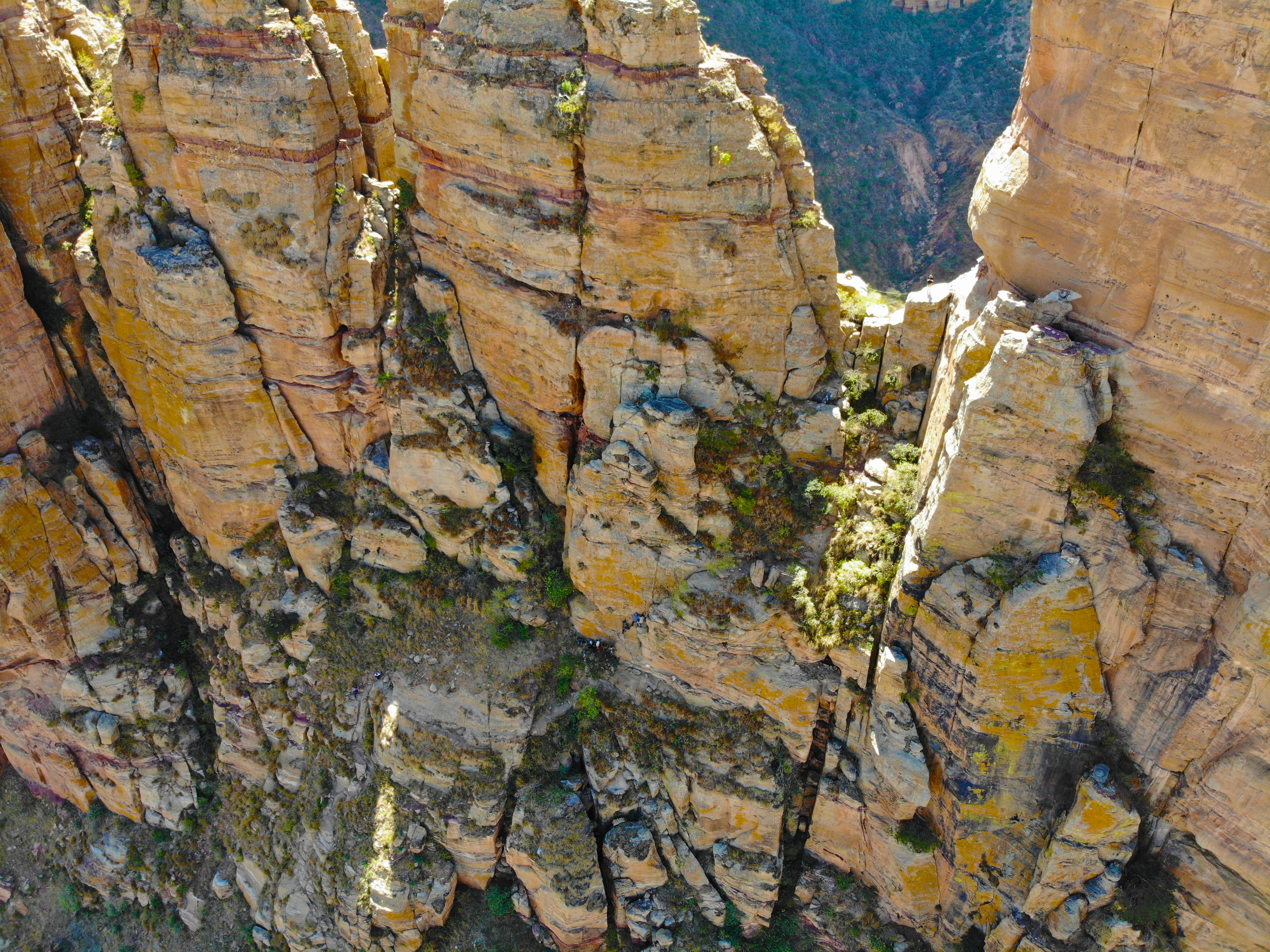
The way to climb into the church. People can be seen at the top and bottom

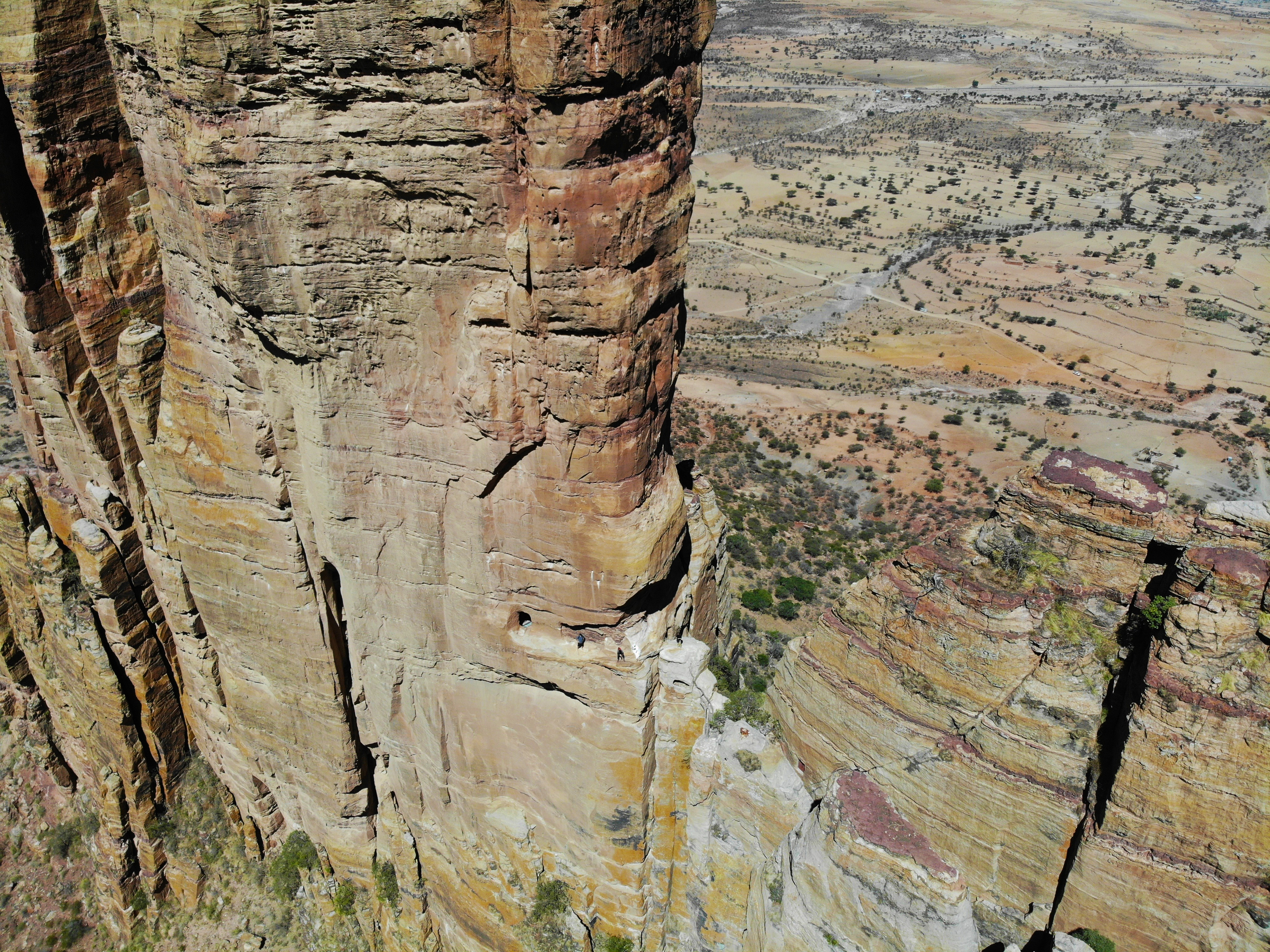
Entrance to the church (the small hole seen in the lower-center)

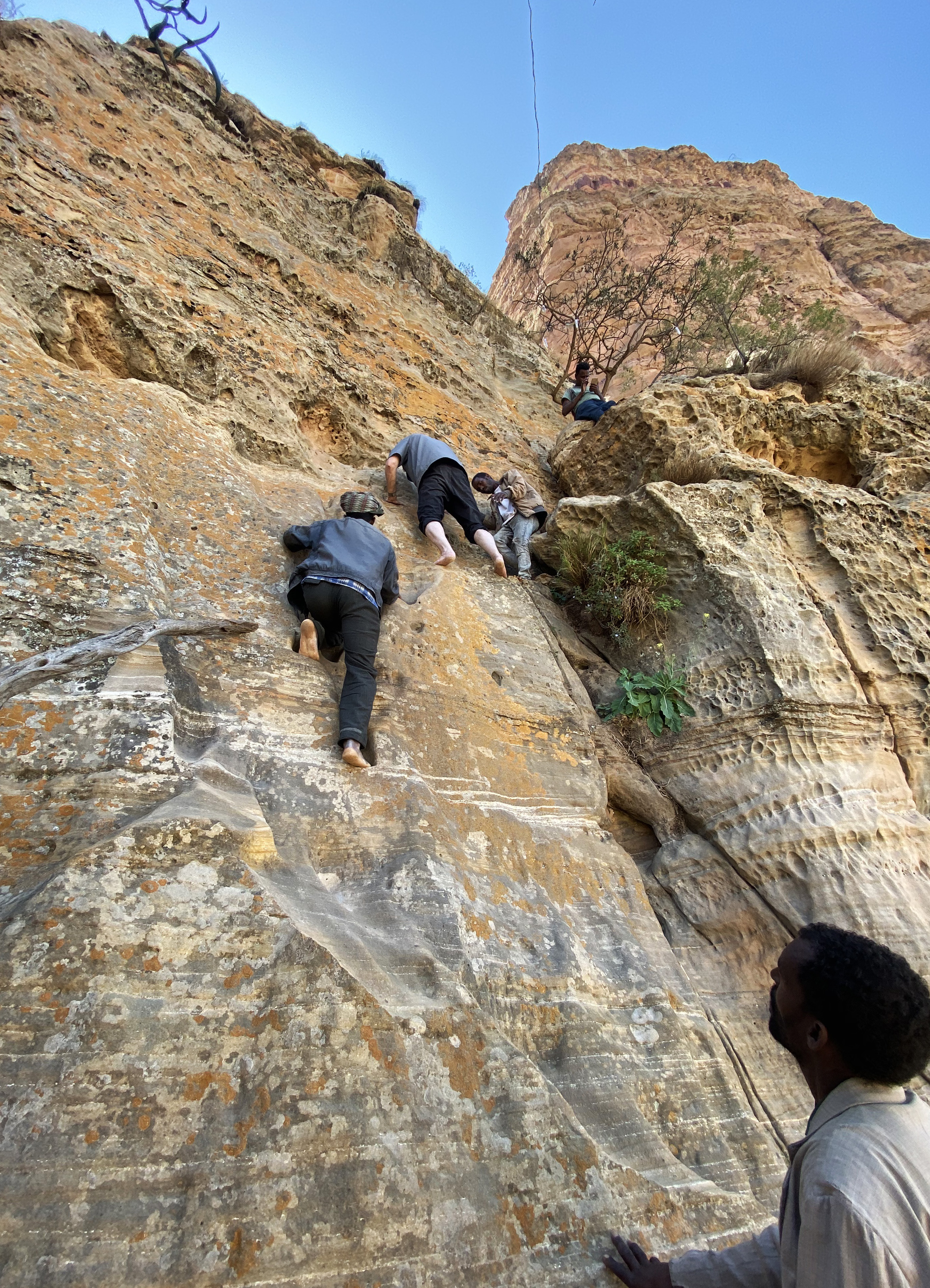
Ascent to the church

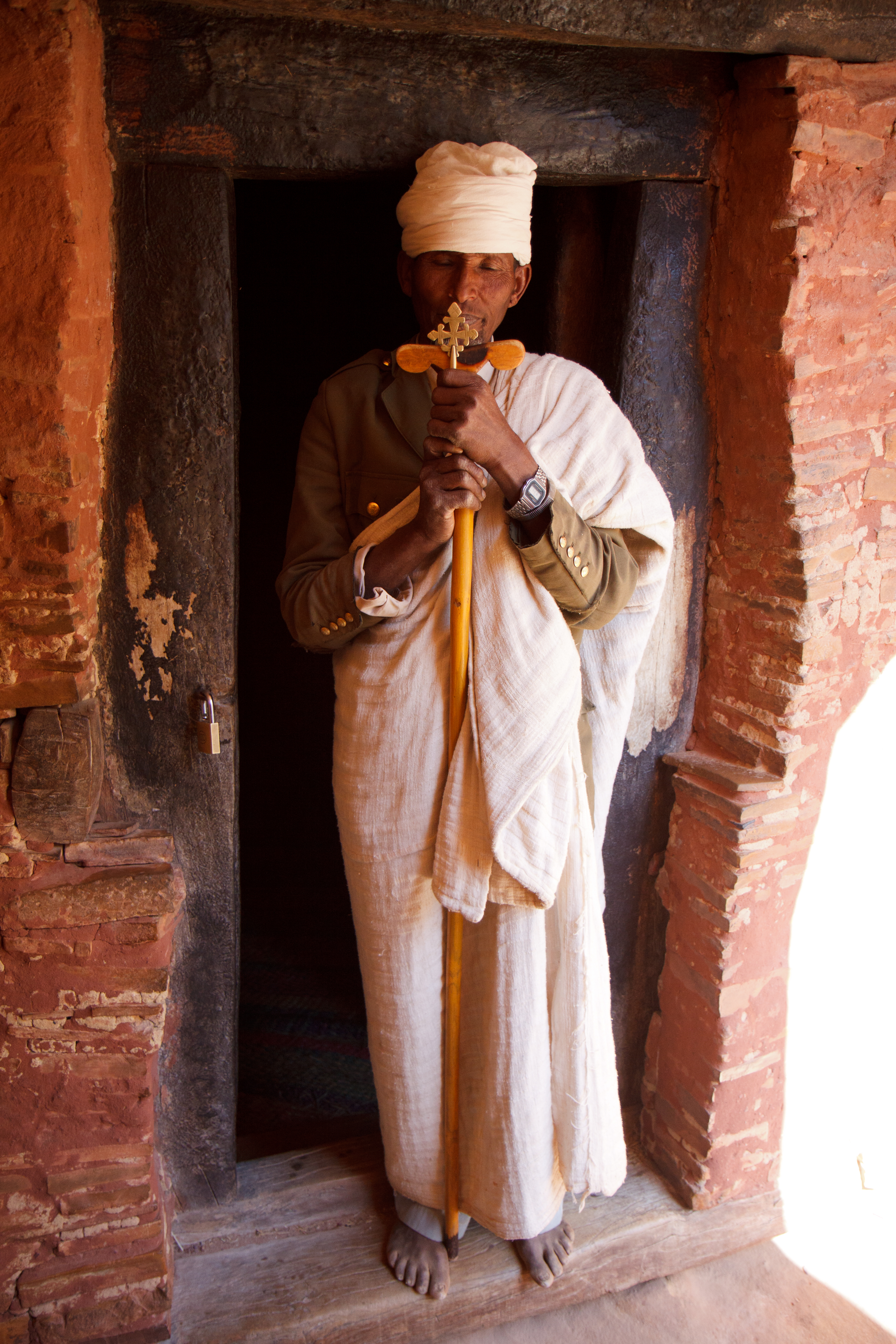
A priest holding the staff

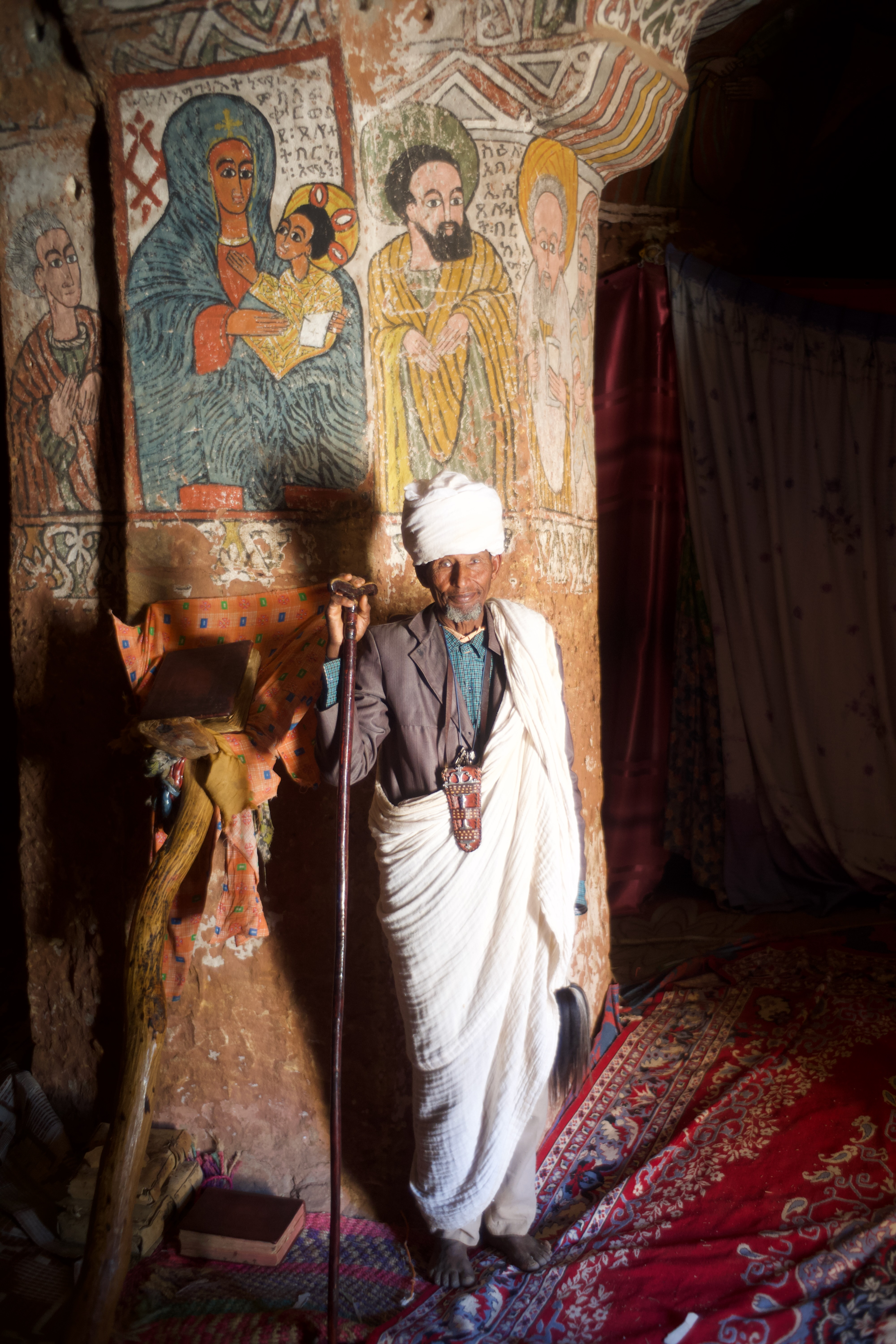
Another monk

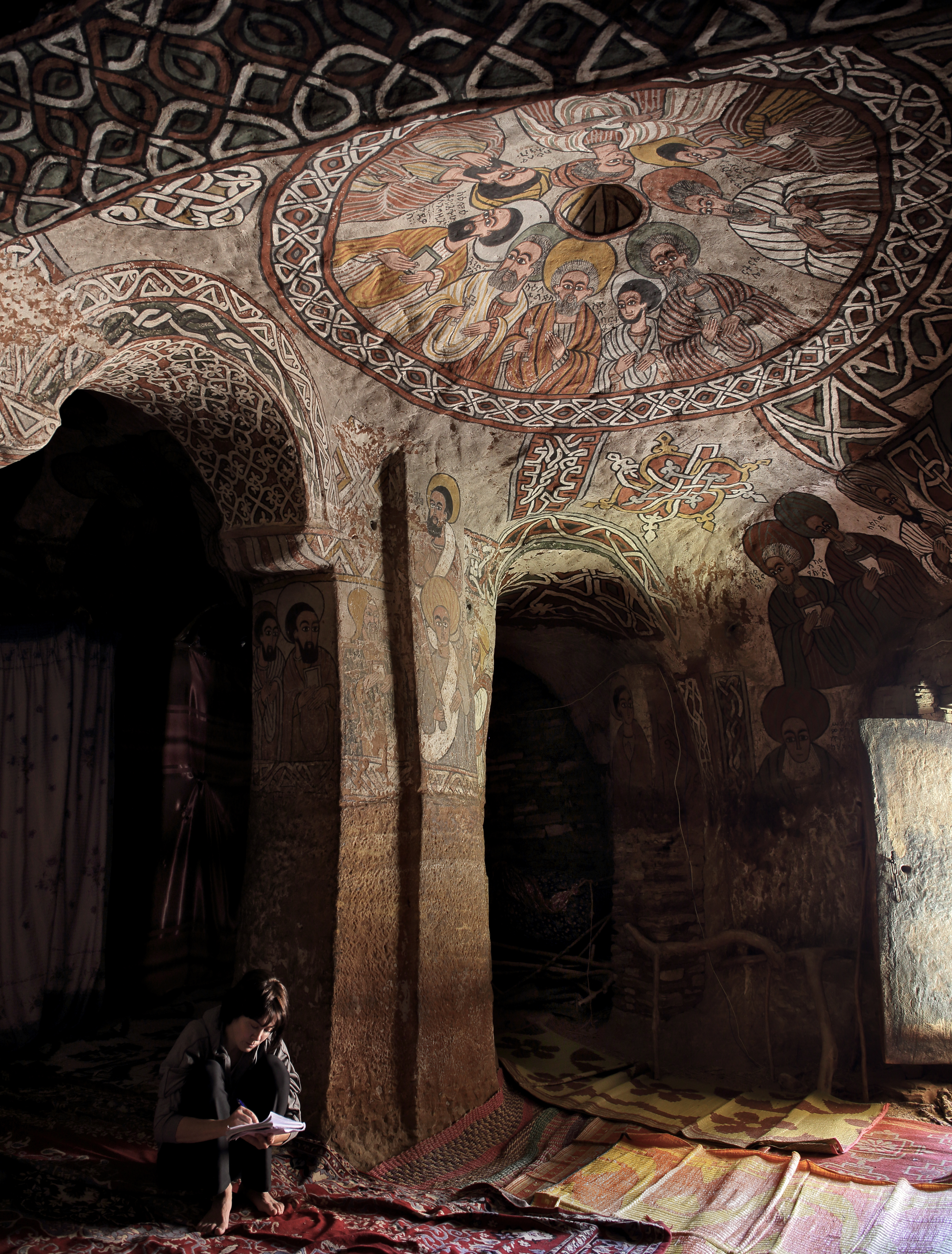
Church interior

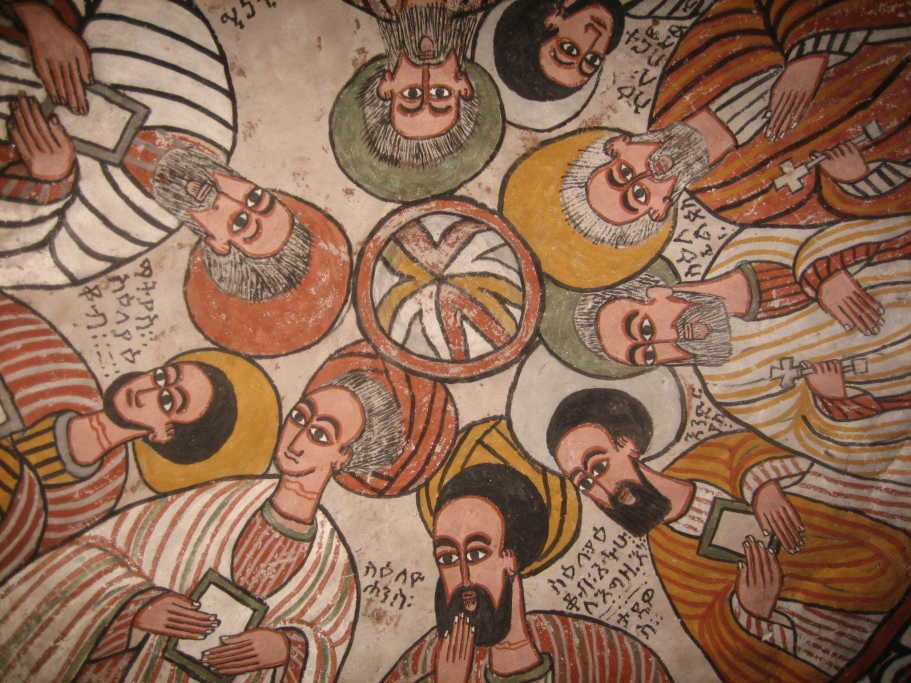
Close up of the fresco

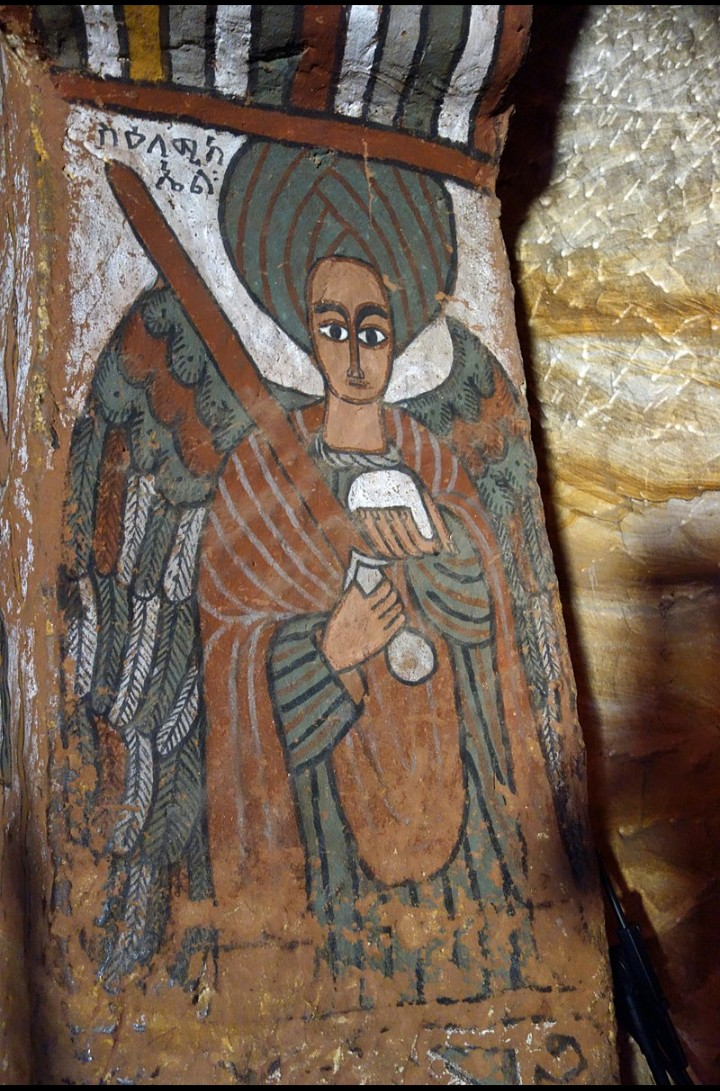
Abuna Yemata

== See also ==
- Apostolic Vicariate of Abyssinia
- Ethiopian Orthodox Tewahedo Church
- Abuna
- Meteora
