= Nine Saints =

Christian missionaries sent to Ethiopia

The Nine Saints were a group of missionaries who were important in the initial growth of Christianity in what is now Ethiopia during the late 5th century. The names of the Nine Saints are:

1. Abba Aftse
2. Abba Alef
3. Abba Aragawi
4. Abba Garima (Isaac or Yeshaq)
5. Abba Guba
6. Abba Liqanos
7. Abba Pantelewon
8. Abba Tsahma
9. Abba Yem'ata

Rugare Rukuni and Erna Oliver identify the Nine Saints as Jewish Christians, and attribute the Judaic character of Ethiopian Christianity, in part, to their influence.

== Origins ==
Although frequently described as coming from Syria, only two or three actually came from that province; according to Paul B. Henze, others have been traced to Constantinople, Anatolia, and even Rome.

The Ethiopian historian Taddesse Tamrat speculates that they may have been connected with the anti-Monophysite and anti-Miaphysite persecutions that followed the Council of Chalcedon, which adopted Dyophysitism. Their activities spread Christianity beyond "a narrow corridor between Adulis and Aksum along the caravan routes."

== Founding of monasteries ==
Besides converting the local inhabitants to Christianity, they also founded a number of monastic houses that followed the rule of Saint Pachomius: Abba Aftse founded the monastery at Yeha; Abba Alef the northernmost establishment at Bi'isa on the south bank of the Mareb River; the foundation of the important monastery of Debre Damo is attributed to Abba Aragawi; Abba Liqanos and Abba Pantelewon are credited with establishing Pentalewon Monastery in Axum; Abba Garima founded Abba Garima Monastery north of Adwa; Abba Guba the one at Madara; Abba Tsahma the one at Sedenya; and Abba Yem'ata founded the southernmost one of the group in the Gar'alta, noted for its Abuna Yemata Guh church named after him.

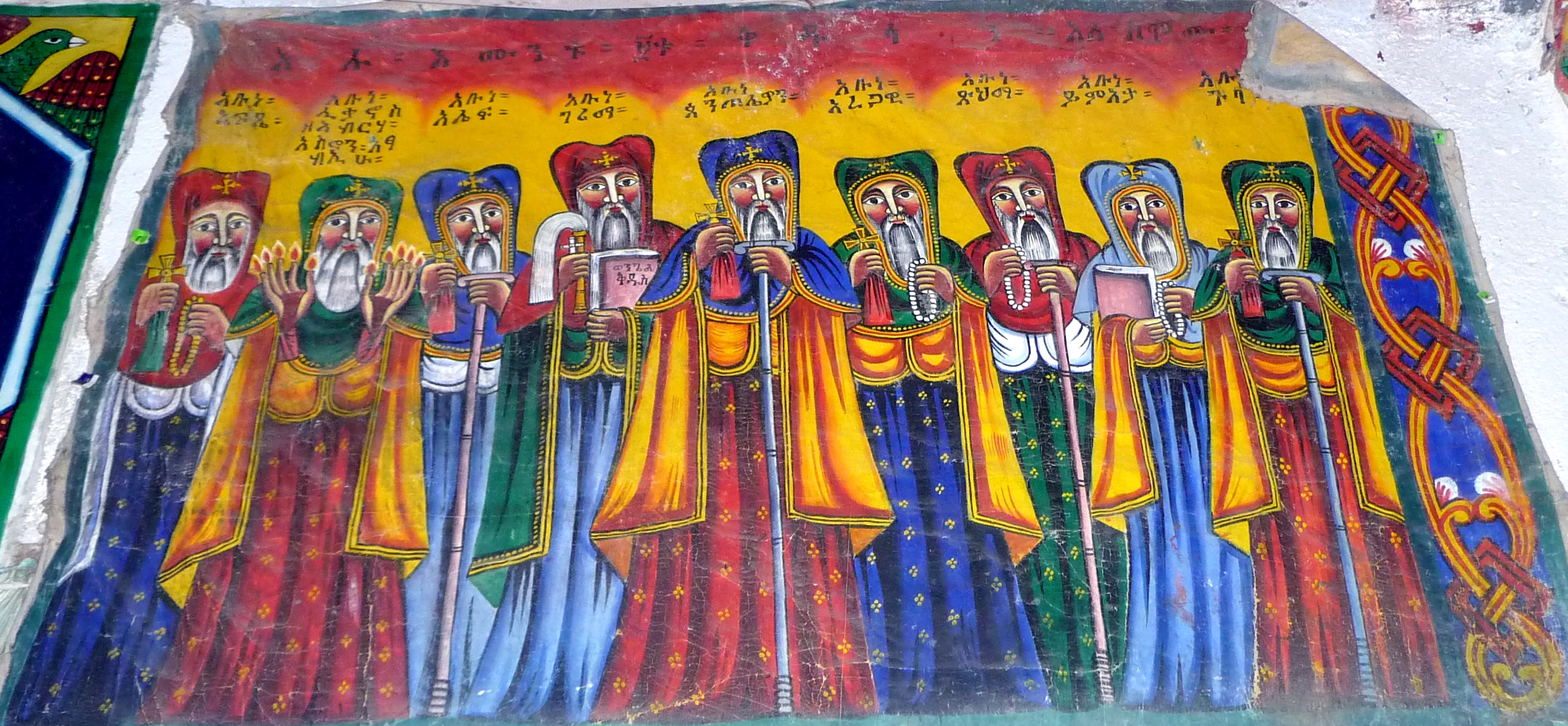
Icon of the Nine Saints, at Abba Pentalewon Monastery near Axum, Ethiopia.

== Abba Garima and the Garima Gospels ==
Recent radiocarbon dating supports the tradition of Saint Abba Garima's arrival at the Abba Garima Monastery in 494. The Garima Gospels, which Garima is said to have written, is now regarded as "the world's earliest illustrated Christian manuscript" and the oldest surviving Ethiopian manuscript of any kind.

== See also ==
- Thirteen Assyrian Fathers
