= Abba Liqanos =

Ethiopian Orthodox Christian saint

Saint Liqanos

Abba
- Born: 5th century Constantinople
- Residence: Ethiopia
- Died: 6th century Ethiopia
- Venerated in: Ethiopian Orthodox Tewahedo Church, Eritrean Orthodox Tewahedo Church
- Feast: December 7
- Attributes: Music

Abba Liqanos (probably fl. late 400s and early 500s A.D.) was one of the Nine Saints of Ethiopia. He is known as a composer of hymns and liturgies.

Abba Liqanos was probably originally from Constantinople and later moved to Däbrä Qwänasel Monastery, located near Adwa.

His feast day is on 28 Hedar (7 December).
