= David Roden Buxton =

David Roden Buxton FSA (26 February 1910 – 17 November 2003) was an entomologist and employee of the British Council. He is best known for his books on Russian architecture, the ancient churches of Ethiopia, and the wooden churches of Eastern Europe.

== Early life and education ==
Buxton was born in 1910 in London to Charles Roden Buxton and Dorothy Frances Buxton (née Jebb). His parents met when they were both students at Cambridge University; his father Charles studied Classics at Trinity College while his mother, Dorothy Jebb, read for a degree in Philosophy and Moral Sciences at Newnham College. They married in 1904 in Cambridge before settling in London. Buxton’s father Charles was a lawyer and a parliamentarian, firstly as a Liberal MP then as a member of the Labour party. Both Charles and Dorothy were members of the Society of Friends, and Dorothy, described as a humanitarian and social activist, co-founded the Save the Children Fund with her sister Eglantyne Jebb.

David Buxton was educated at Leighton Park Quaker School, with his early education including a year at a school in the Swiss Alps, and Trinity College. At Cambridge University he read Natural Sciences, specialising in entomology, and graduated with a BA in 1931 and an MA in 1936.

== Career ==
Buxton travelled extensively both for his career and privately. After leaving university he worked in Kenya and Uganda researching locusts, took part in a Natural History Museum expedition to the Ruwenzori Mountains in 1934-35, and, working with the Imperial Institute of Entomology, he discovered a previously unrecorded species of beetles that bear his name.

In 1937 he joined the Colonial Service and worked in Nigeria on the control of the tsetse fly, that carries sleeping sickness, and then in Sierra Leone as an education officer. He moved to Ethiopia and worked there from 1942 to 1949, firstly with the Colonial Service although during the last three years he was employed by the British Council on educational projects. He moved back to Europe in 1949 and continued to work for the British Council on various assignments in Austria, Italy and Germany. His final posting was in Cambridge from 1962 to 1969.

== Other ==
In his obituary in The Times, Buxton is described as “a prolific photographer and a linguist”, a passionate traveller and, “by inclination, a scholar” and this is borne out by the number of publications in his name.

Travelling with his parents and sister, Buxton first went to Russia in 1927 visiting Moscow and other cities and undertaking walking tours of the countryside. He returned to the Soviet Union on his own in 1928 to undertake a study on medieval architecture, visiting Central and North West Russia, the Volga Region and parts of Ukraine and, in 1932, he travelled to Northern Russia. He learnt Russian, one of the eight foreign languages in which he was proficient. His resultant book Russian Mediaeval Architecture published in 1934 was the first book in English on the subject and was reissued by Cambridge University Press in 2014.

Later in life he made annual research trips to study wooden churches in Poland, Czechoslovakia, Hungary, Romania, Yugoslavia, Finland and Ukraine and his book, The Wooden Churches of Eastern Europe was published in 1981. Buxton also wrote on Ethiopia and, during his time in the country, studied its Christian culture bringing attention to its rock-hewn churches through articles in archaeological journals. He is also credited with helping to save the ancient church at Debre Damo, the earliest existing church in Ethiopia. In retirement in Cambridgeshire he continued his research on ancient Ethiopia with the assistance of a Fellowship from Clare Hall and wrote the book The Abyssinians for Thames and Hudson’s series, Ancient Places and People.

A collection of Buxton's papers and photographs relating to Russian and Eastern European architecture is held by Cambridge University Library and further papers are held at UCL.

=== Photography ===
Buxton’s books are illustrated with his photographs and he also took photographs of churches in Rome that are included in Émile Mâle’s book The Early Churches of Rome which Buxton translated for the English market. His photographs of Russian churches “procured with much difficulty” are acknowledged by Hugh Braun in his book Historical Architecture and photographs taken by Buxton during the family’s visit to Russia in 1927 are included in the book Iron Curtain: From Stage to Cold War written by Patrick Wright, a distant cousin. Photographs attributed to Buxton are also held in the Conway Library whose archive, of primarily architectural images, is being digitised under the wider Courtauld Connects project.

== Private life ==
On 24 September 1939 Buxton married Annelore Gerstl, the stepdaughter of the artist Arnold Gerstl whose pencil drawing of David Roden Buxton is held in Leicester’s German Expressionist Collection. They had a son but divorced in 1948. With his second wife Mary Violet Buxton (married 9 December 1950) he had five children.

== Selected publications ==
- Russian Mediaeval Architecture: With an Account of the Transcaucasian Styles and their Influence in the West, Cambridge University Press, 2014 (originally published in 1934), ISBN 9781107434509
- The Wooden Churches of Eastern Europe : An Introductory Survey, Cambridge University Press, 1981, (reissued 1989), ISBN 978-0521090544
- Wooden Architecture of Russia : Houses, Fortifications, and Churches, Alexander Opolovnikov and Yelena Opolovnikova, colour photographs by Vadim Gippenreiter, edited and introduced by David Buxton, London : Thames & Hudson, 1989, ISBN 978-0810917712
- The Abyssinians, London : Thames & Hudson, 1970, ISBN 0500020701
- The Early Churches of Rome, Émile Mâle, translated by David Buxton, London : Ernest Benn, 1960
- Travels in Ethiopia, London : Lindsay Drummond, 1949
- Field Observations on Locusts in Eastern Africa, H. B. Johnston and D. R. Buxton, With plates, London : Anti-Locust Research Centre, 1949
- The Christian Antiquities of Northern Ethiopia, Oxford : Society of Antiquaries of London, 1947
