= Ethiopian Heritage Fund =

British charity

The Ethiopian Heritage Fund is a British charity that works to preserve the antiquities and manuscripts of Ethiopian Orthodox monasteries.
