= Abba Alef =

Ethiopian Orthodox Christian saint

Saint Alef

Abba
- Born: 5th century
- Residence: Ethiopia
- Died: 6th century Ethiopia
- Venerated in: Ethiopian Orthodox Tewahedo Church, Eritrean Orthodox Tewahedo Church
- Feast: March 20

Abba ‘Aléf was one of the Nine Saints of Ethiopia. He is known for founding a monastery in Bi’isa (or Beheza) in Ahseya.

His feast day is on 11 Mäggabit (20 March).
