= Abba Tsahma =

Ethiopian Orthodox Christian saint

Saint Tsahma

Abba
- Born: 5th century Antioch
- Residence: Ethiopia
- Died: 6th century Ethiopia
- Venerated in: Ethiopian Orthodox Tewahedo Church, Eritrean Orthodox Tewahedo Church
- Feast: January 24
- Attributes: Scholar

Abba Tsahma or Sähma (probably fl. late 400s and early 500s A.D.) was one of the Nine Saints of Ethiopia. He was known as a scholar.

Abba Tsahma may have originally been from Antioch. He later moved to Sädénya, Ethiopia.

His feast day is on 16 Ter (24 January).
