= Abba Yem'ata =

Ethiopian Orthodox Christian saint

Saint Yem’ata

Abba
- Born: 5th century
- Residence: Ethiopia
- Died: 6th century Ethiopia
- Venerated in: Ethiopian Orthodox Tewahedo Church, Eritrean Orthodox Tewahedo Church
- Feast: November 2

Abba Yäm’ata or Yem’ata (probably fl. late 400s and early 500s A.D.) was one of the Nine Saints of Ethiopia.

He founded a monastery in Gär’alta in Endärta woreda, Tigray Region. His feast day is on 23 Teqemt (2 November).

The church of Abuna Yemata Guh is dedicated to him.
