= Abba Garima Monastery =

Ethiopian Orthodox monastery in Tigray Region, Ethiopia

Coordinates: 14°9′42″N 38°57′10″E

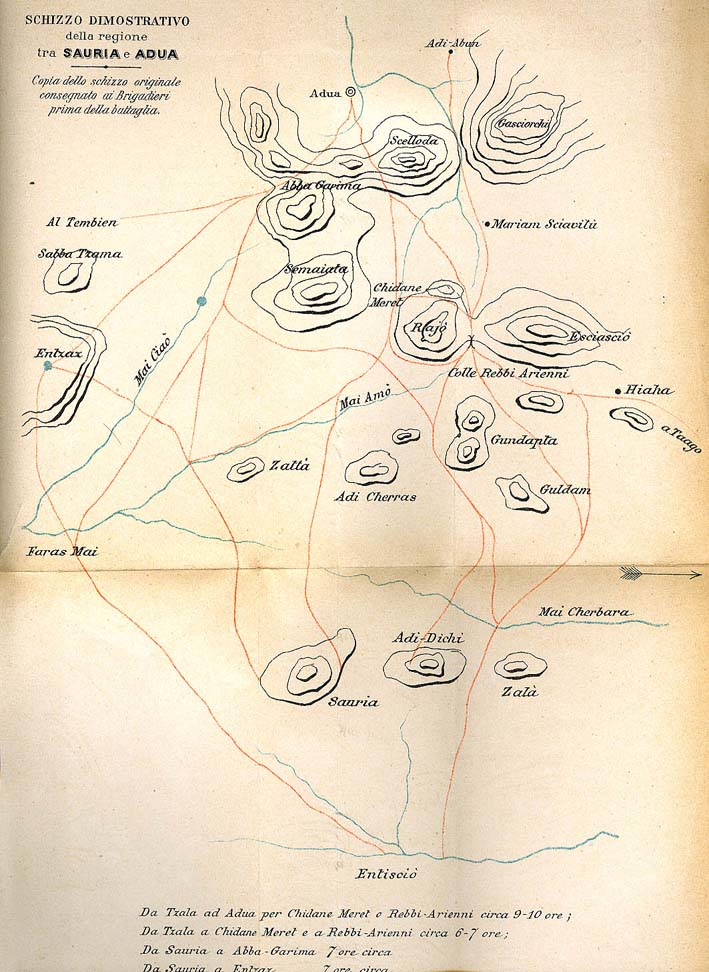
An 1890s Italian map of Adwa, showing Abba Garima and other notable places east of Adwa (the map appears to be facing west)

Abba Garima Monastery is an Ethiopian Orthodox church, located around five kilometers east of Adwa, in the Mehakelegnaw Zone of the northern Tigray Region in Ethiopia. It was established in the sixth century by one of the Nine Saints, Abba Garima, and built by King Gabra Masqal (also Gebre Meskel). The monastery became known for its early manuscript copy of the gospels and its treasury.

== History ==
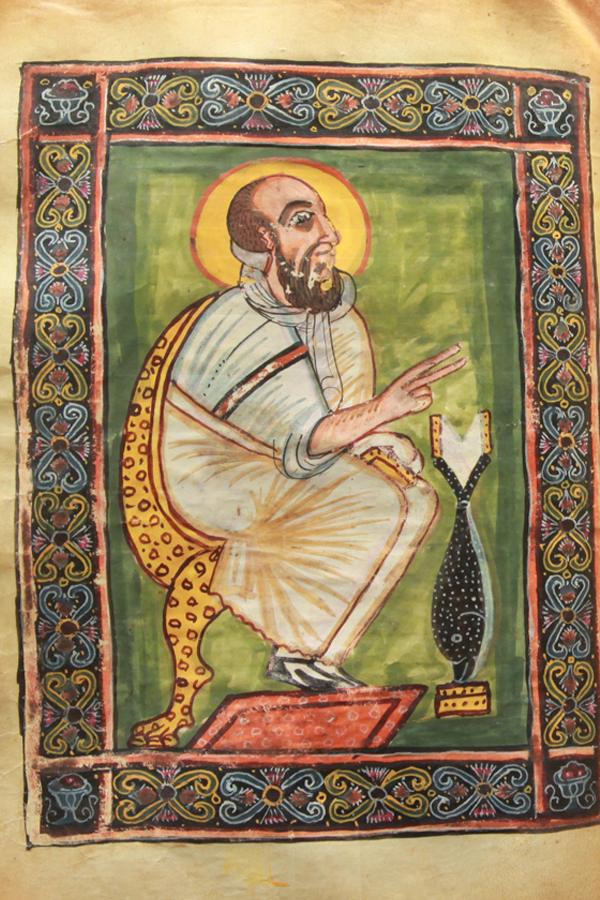
Sixth century portrait illumination of Mark from Gärima 2, likely the earlier of the two Gärima Gospels

The first European recorded to have visited the monastery in modern times was Henry Salt, who visited it on 14 September 1805. He was told at the time that the building had been built by Prince Gabra Masqal, a son of Emperor Kaleb, in 560.

Beatrice Playne visited the monastery around 1950 and found that the church had burned down twenty years prior and had been rebuilt before her arrival. Nevertheless, she was shown several prized possessions which were centuries old, including a number of illuminated manuscripts "whose ornamental headings struck me as Syrian in style." The last treasure she was shown was "an ancient spring which, they said, had never failed since the beginning of the world."

The family of the fifth Patriarch of the Ethiopian Orthodox Church, Patriarch Abune Paulos, was long associated with the Abune Garima monastery. It was at this monastery that the Patriarch first took monastic vows as Abba Gebre Medhin.

A new study of the three ancient Abba Garima Gospels is available in the article by Sergey Kim in the online journal "Afriques. Débats, méthodes et terrains d'histoire", 13 (2022).

== Layout and artifacts ==
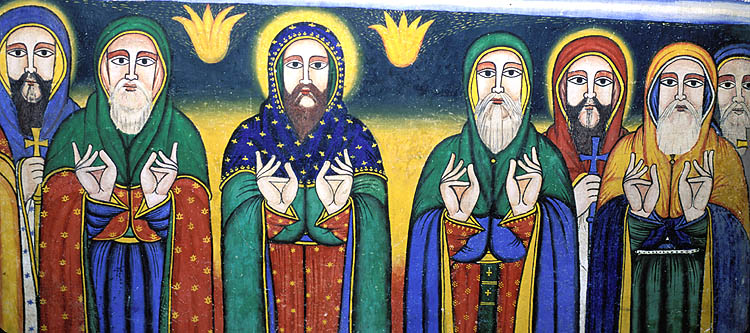
The Nine Saints (not all in photo) of the Ethiopian Orthodox Church

The most important layout and artifacts include two illuminated Garima Gospels which have been restored and are housed in a former chapel for female pilgrims. Most biblical scholars had previously proposed that these gospels, though inspired by Abba Garima's example, must have been written centuries after his death, probably in the tenth century or later. However, recent radiocarbon dating carried out at Oxford University has confirmed a date between AD 390 and AD 570 for Garima 2. This is likely the earlier of the two gospel books; meaning that it may well be older than Abba Garima himself. If so, they are the earliest surviving dated Christian illuminated manuscripts.

== See also ==
- Garima Gospels
