= Abba Garima =

Ethiopian Orthodox Christian saint

Saint Garima

Abba
- Born: 5th century
- Residence: Ethiopia
- Died: 6th century Ethiopia
- Venerated in: Ethiopian Orthodox Tewahedo Church, Eritrean Orthodox Tewahedo Church
- Feast: June 24
- Attributes: Craftsman

Abba Gärima (Geʽez: አባ ገሪማ; also known as Abba Yeshaq; fl. c. late 400s and early 500s A.D.), was one of the Nine Saints of Ethiopia. A hagiography about him was written in a late 15th-century gädl (Acts) composed at Endä Gärima by a bishop Yohannan.

Abba Garima is known for founding the Abba Garima Monastery, and was also known as a craftsman.

== Life ==
According to the hagiographical "Life," his father was Mäsfeyanos, King of Rum (Byzantium).

After his father's death, he became a king for 7 years, after which Abba Päntäléwon summoned him to be a monk with him for 5 years.

Afterwards, Abba Gärima established a monastery at Mädära, where he stayed for about 20 years. At Mädära, he was a wonderworker who exorcised demons and performed miracles for the sick.

Gärima died on 17 Säné (24 June).

== See also ==
- Abba Garima Monastery
- Garima Gospels
