= Abba Pantelewon =

Christian monk and missionary in Ethiopia

Saint Pantelewon
- Abba Pantelewon in the Nine Saints

Abba
- Born: 470; Either Constantinople or Rome, Byzantine Empire
- Died: 522; Ethiopia
- Venerated in: Ethiopian Orthodox Tewahedo Church

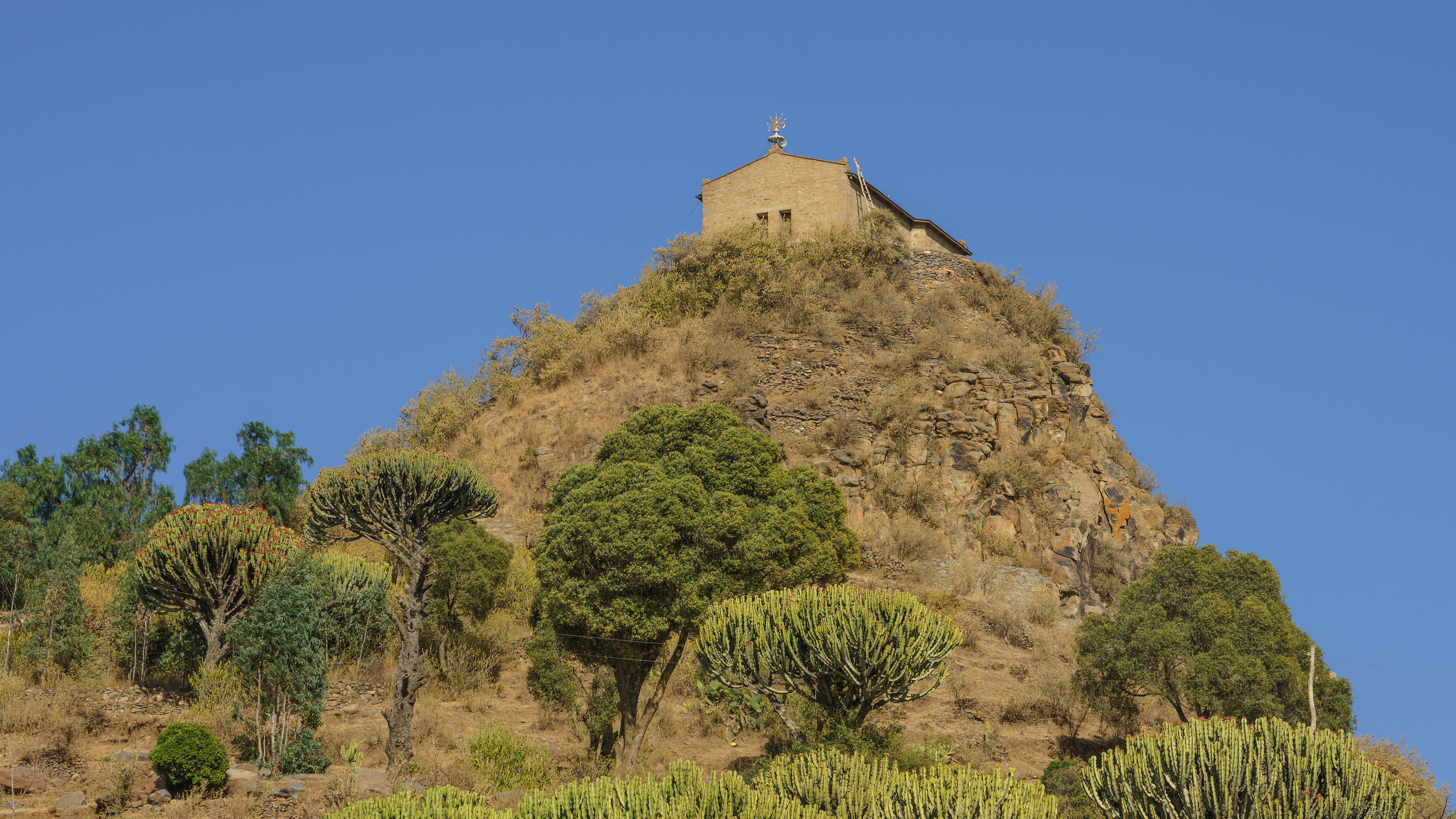
Abba Pantelewon Monastery

Abba Pantelewon አባ ጰንጠሌዎን (Amharic) (also Pantalewon, Päntäléwon, Päntäléyon Zä-Soma’Et, Pentelewon, or Pantaleon) (c. 470 – 522) was a Christian monk who is traditionally credited with founding Pentalewon Monastery located on the top of Mai Qoho Hill northwest of Axum in Tigray, Ethiopia. He is one of the members of the group known as the Nine Saints.

Abba Pantelewon was born in a noble Byzantine family. In 480 AD, Abba Pantelewon arrived in Axum, the first great capital city of Ethiopia, as well as other 9 saints from different parts of the Rome Empire. They were escaping the impositions of the Chalcedonian Council of 451 AD, which had declared their Miaphysitism to be a heresy. They contributed greatly to the spread and flourishing of Ethiopian Christianity. They built churches in different parts of ancient Ethiopia, organized Christian centers. They also learned the Ge’ez language that was spoken in Ethiopia and made the first translations of Bible into Ge'ez. They establish many monasteries in the Tigre region and in the area outside Aksum, the most famous of which is Dabra Damo.

The bishop Afonso Mendes, who had been the Roman Catholic Patriarch of Ethiopia under Emperor Susenyos, cited the "Chronicle of Axum" as saying about the Nine Saints, "In the days of Amiamid [i.e., Ella Amida] many monks came from Rum, who fill'd all the Empire; Nine of them stay'd in Tigre, and each of them erected a Church of his own Name." Bishop Mendez adds another tradition, which tells that when King Kaleb was asked to cross the Red Sea and overthrow the Jewish king Dhu Nuwas, who had slaughtered some 340 local Christians for their beliefs, his first step was to go to Pentelewon for his blessing on the adventure. Pentelewon was said to have shut himself in a tower for 45 years, which Mendez identifies with Pentalewon Monastery near Axum. Mendez also uses the information in this traditional story to date Pentelewon's arrival at the court of the king of Axum to "between 470 and 480." Tradition also states that when Kaleb abdicated the throne to become a monk, it was Abba Pantelewon's monastery he retreated to.
