= Debre Dammo =

Monastery in Tigray Region, Ethiopia

Debre Dammo ደብረ ዳሞ Debre Damo, Dabra Dāmmo, Däbrä Dammo
- Mountain and Monastery
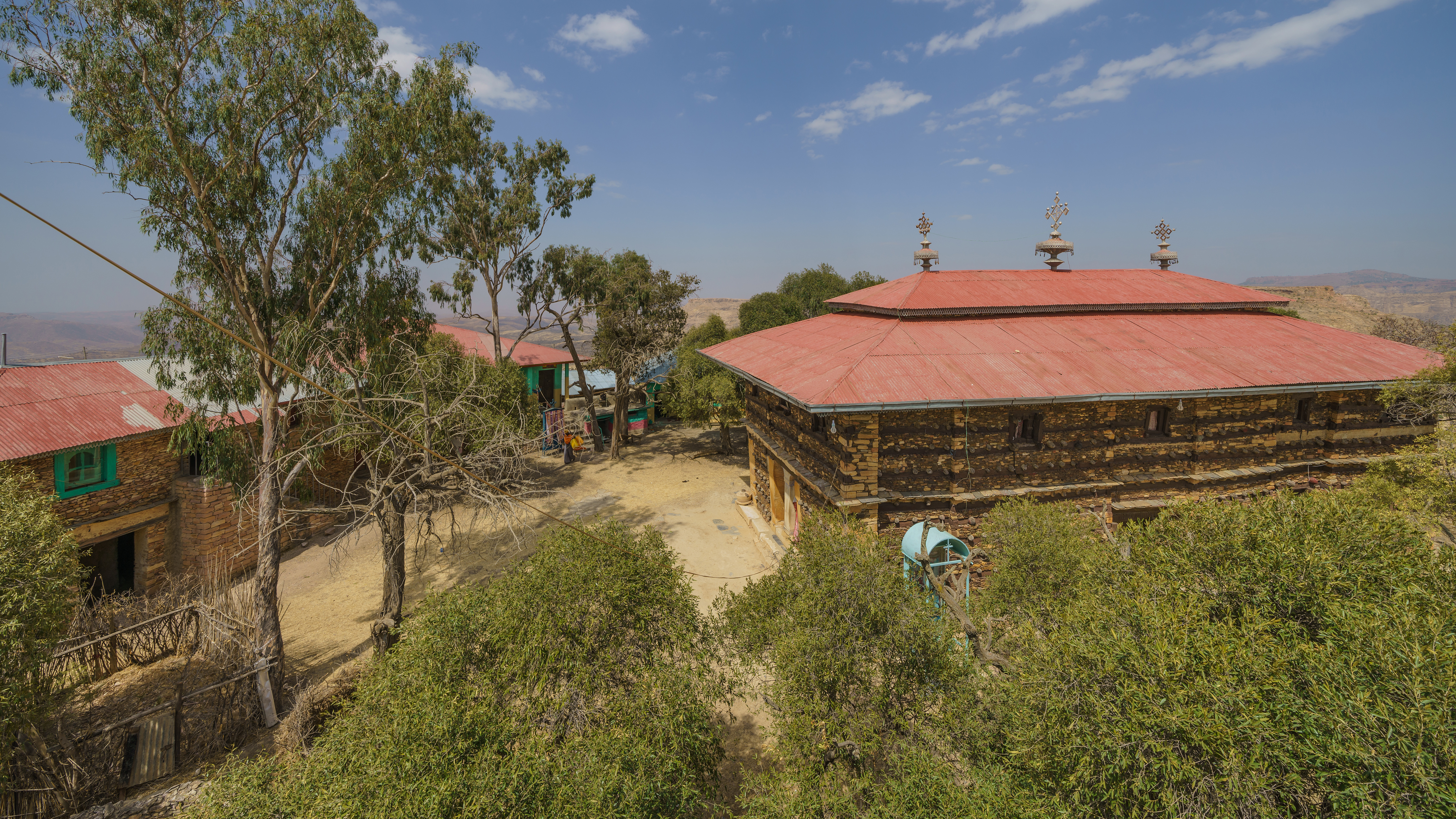

- Location within Ethiopia
- Coordinates: 14°22′26″N 39°17′25″E
- Country: Ethiopia
- Region: Tigray
- Zone: Maekelay Zone
- Elevation: 2,216 m (7,270 ft)

Debre Dammo (Tigrinya: ደብረ ዳሞ), Däbrä Dammo (with the geminated -mm-) in Tigrinya or Däbrä Damo in later Amharic appellations (also spelled Debre Damo, Dabra Dāmmo or Däbrä Dammo), is the name of a flat-topped mountain, or amba, and a 6th-century monastery in the Tigray Region of Ethiopia. The mountain is a steeply rising plateau of trapezoidal shape, about 1,000 by 400 m (3,300 by 1,300 ft) in size. It sits at an elevation of 2,216 m (7,270 ft) above sea level. It is north of Bizet and northwest of Adigrat in the Central Zone, Tigray, close to the border with Eritrea.

The mountain hosts a monastery, accessible only by rope up a sheer cliff 15 m (49 ft) high, which is known for its collection of manuscripts and for having the earliest existing church building in Ethiopia that is still in its original style. Only men can visit the monastery. Tradition claims that it was founded in the 6th century by Abuna Aregawi.

Abune Mathias, Patriarch of the Ethiopian Orthodox Church, has claimed that several churches were burned during the Tigray War, including Debre Damo. These claims have not been independently verified. He did not state who was responsible.

== Monastery ==
Debre Dammo
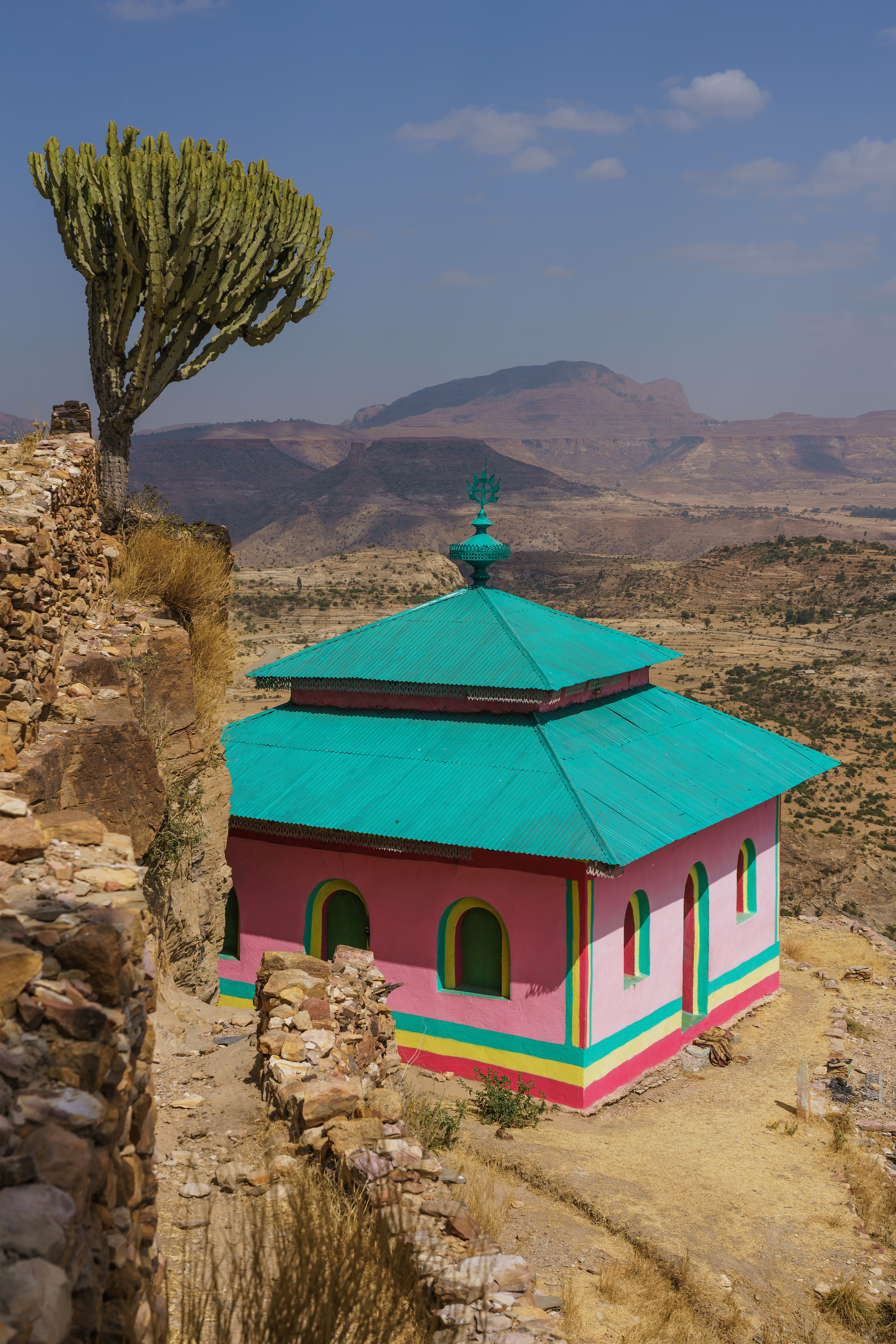
- The church believed to be Abuna Aragawi's house
- Interactive map of Debre Dammo

Monastery information
- Denomination: Orthodox Tewahedo
- Established: 6th century AD
- Dedication: Later life of Saint Abuna Aregawi

People
- Founder: Abuna Aregawi

Architecture
- Style: Aksumite architecture

Site
- Location: Debre Dammo, Tigray Region
- Country: Ethiopia
- Coordinates: 14.372386°N 39.288818°E

The monastery received its first archeological examination by E. Litton, who led a German expedition to northern Ethiopia in the early 20th century. By the time that David Buxton saw the ancient church in the mid-1940s, he found it "on the point of collapse". A few years later, an English architect, DH Matthews, assisted in the restoration of the building, which included the rebuilding of one of its wood and stone walls (a characteristic style of Aksumite architecture).

Thomas Pakenham, who visited the church in 1955, records a tradition that Debre Dammo had also once been a royal prison for heirs to the Emperor of Ethiopia, like the better-known Wehni and Amba Geshen. The exterior walls of the church were built of alternating courses of limestone blocks and wood, "fitted with the projecting stumps that Ethiopians call 'monkey heads'". Once inside, Pakenham was in awe of what he saw:

First we were shown the narthex or ante-chamber. In its dusty ceiling one could dimly make out a series of wood-carvings – peacocks drinking from a vase, a lion and a monkey, several fabulous animals. These, as I knew, were probably copies from Syrian textiles imported into the country. The designs looked familiar enough – hardly different from the fabulous beasts that decorate our Romanesque churches. And in fact, as I reflected, the art of Egypt and Syria and Byzantium was developing on similar lines to European art when these panels were being cut. ...

When we had gained the nave of the church, the full excitement of the architecture was apparent. The stones holding up the roof piers were actual Axumite relics incorporated in the Christian structure; while the doors and windows which held up the roof were all Axumite in style; their knobbly frames were of exactly the same design as those on the obelisks I had seen at Axum. But the demands of the Christian church had produced entirely un-Axumite features. Below the nave roof a 'clerestory' of wooden windows let in a dim religious light from the outside world. And just visible above the ubiquitous draperies that shrouded the church in hieratic gloom, we could see a chancel arch leading to the sanctuary. ...

=== Rumours of destruction ===
On 7 May 2021 a YouTube video was published by Denis Wadley in which the Patriarch of the Ethiopian Orthodox Church, Abune Mathias, claimed that several churches had been burned during Tigray War. The claims included Debre Damo, in which he stated that a monk was killed. He did not specify who was responsible. Visitors to the monastery in early 2025 refute the claims; the monastery and the compound are intact.

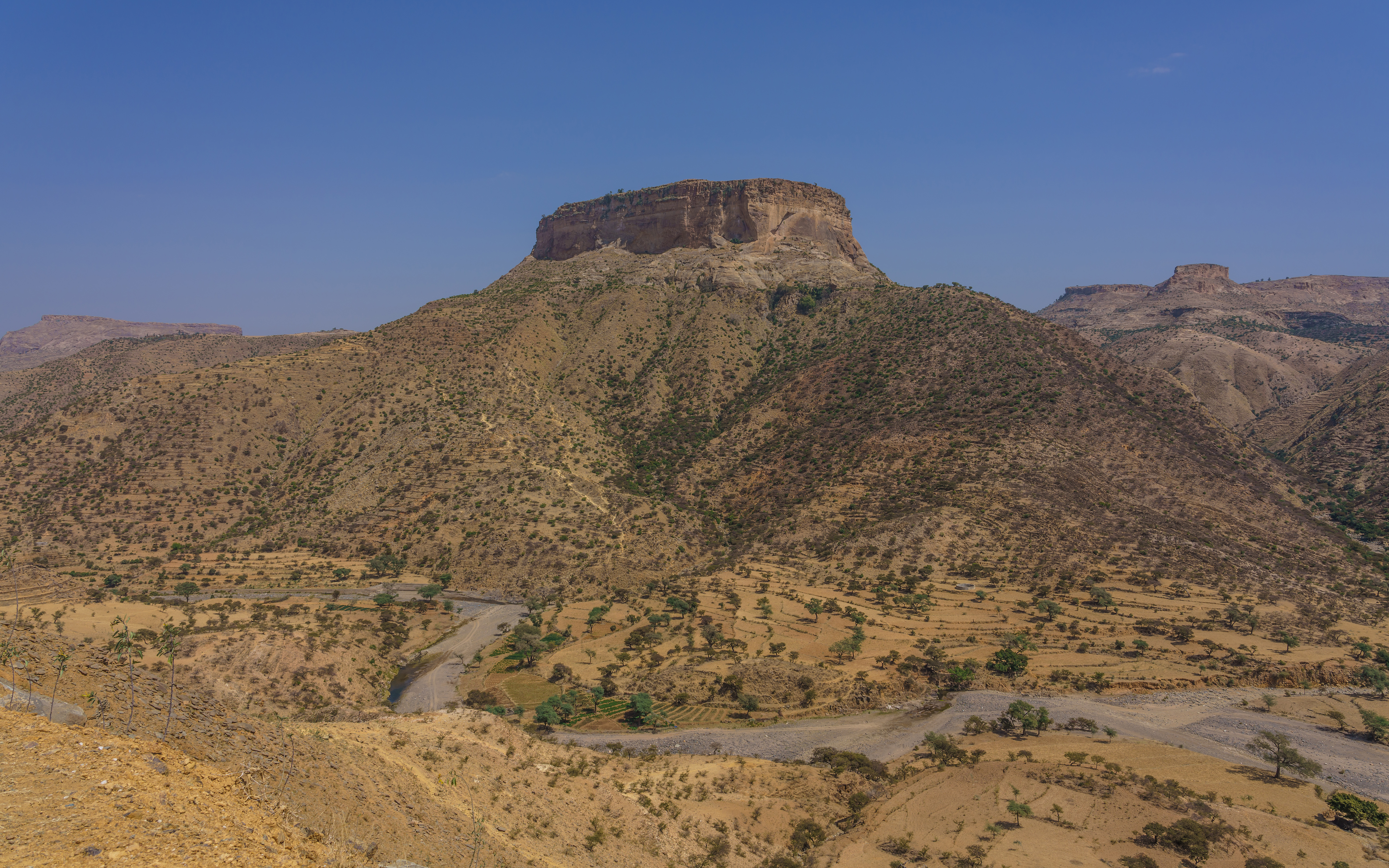
Debre Dammo amba

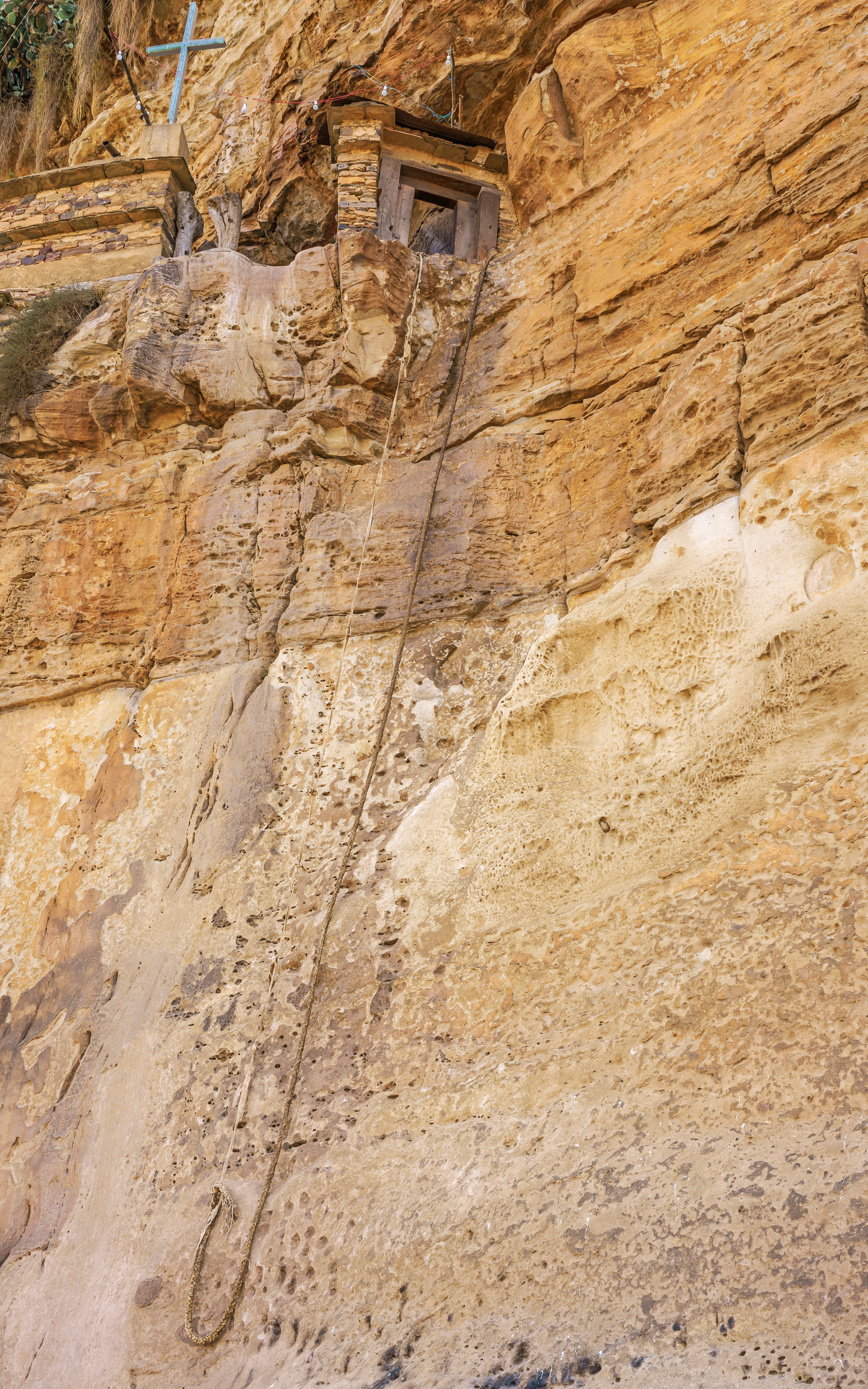
The way up to the monastery

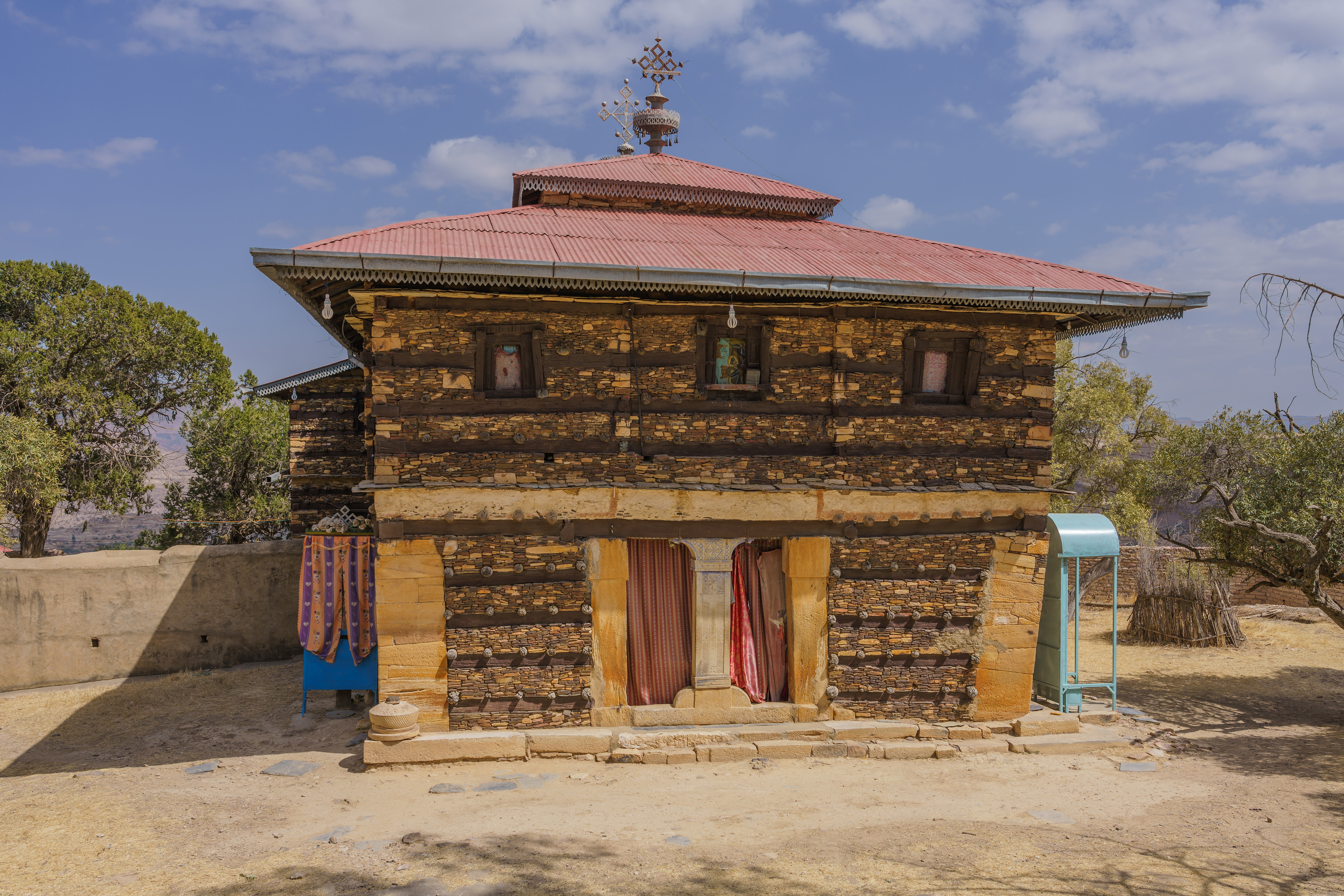
The main church of Debre Dammo

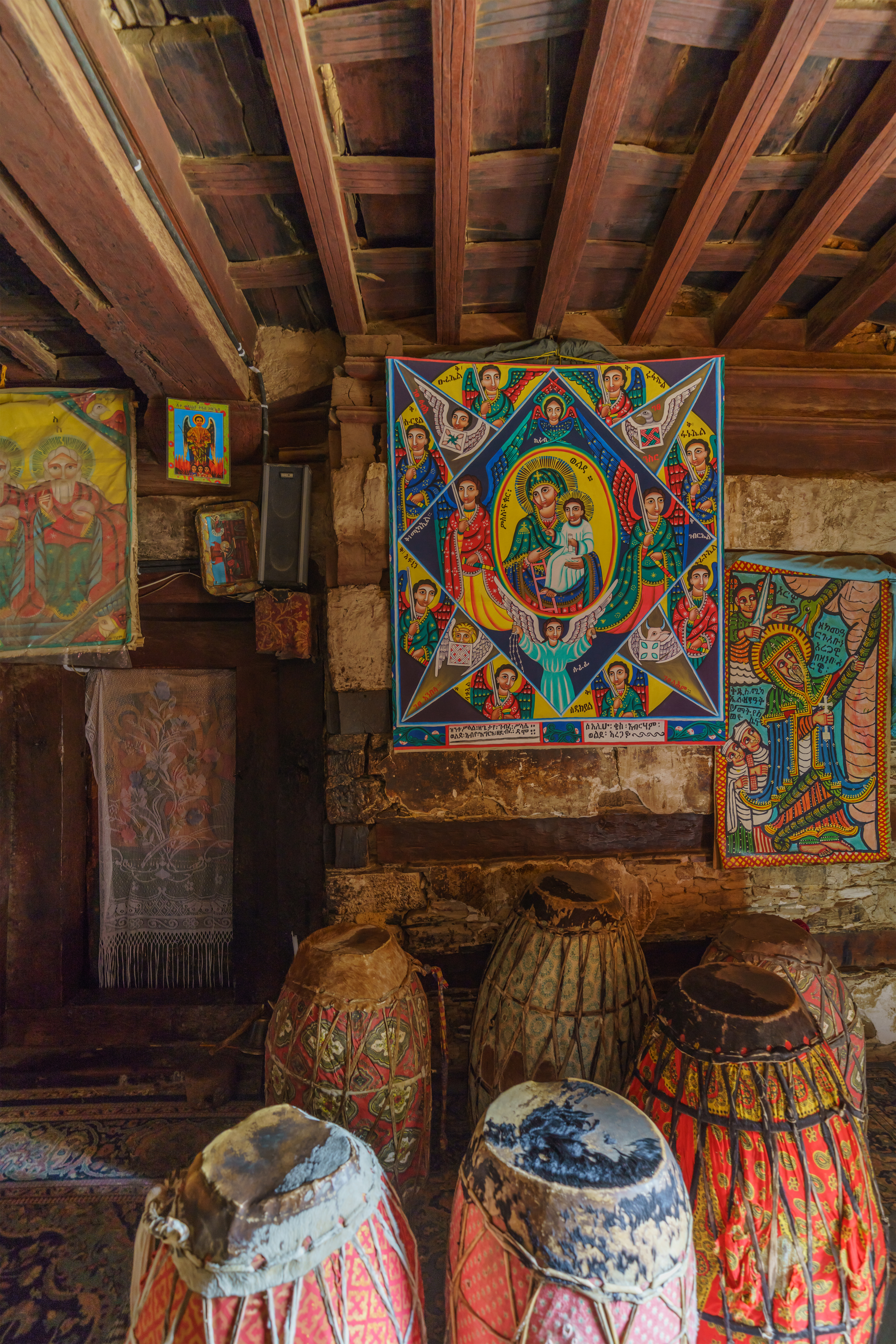
Interior of the main church

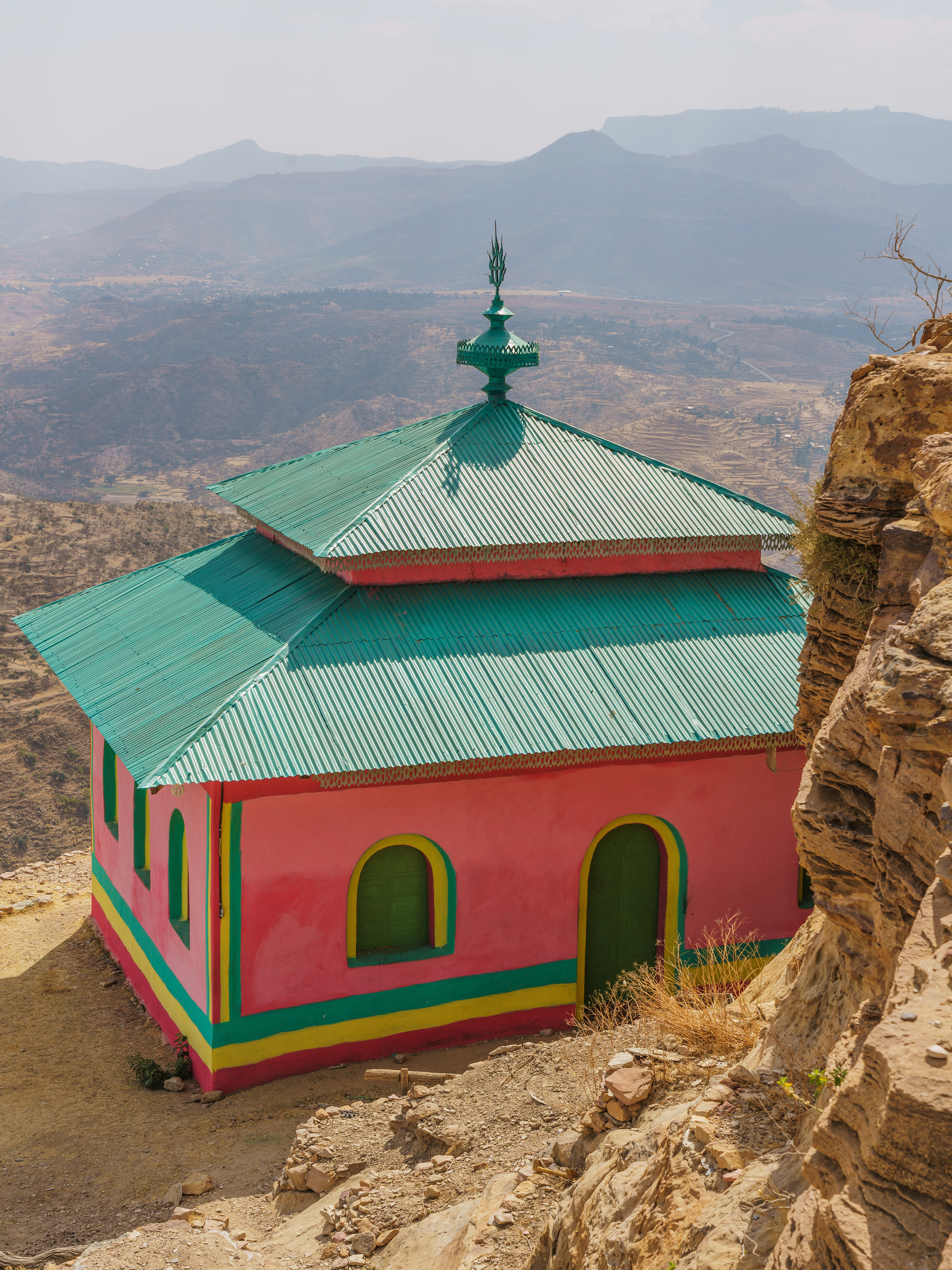
Debre Dammo Monastery, seen from a different angle.

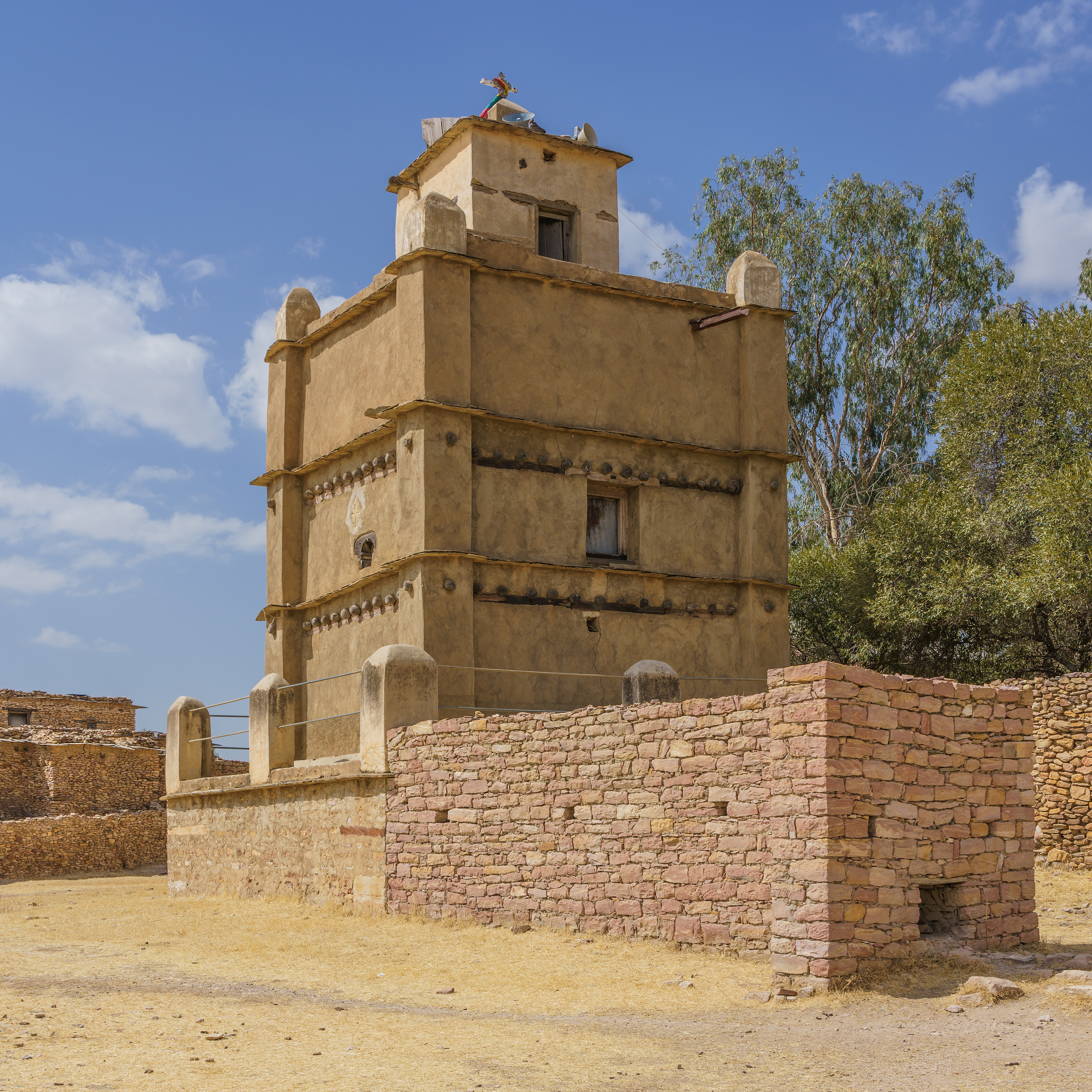
Bell tower
