= Orthodox Tewahedo music =

Sacred music of the Ethiopian and Eritrean Orthodox Tewahedo Church

Orthodox Tewahedo music refers to sacred music of the Ethiopian and Eritrean Orthodox Tewahedo Church. The music was long associated with Zema (chant), developed by the six century composer Yared. It is essential part of liturgical service in the Church and classified into fourteen anaphoras, with the normal use being the Twelve Apostles.

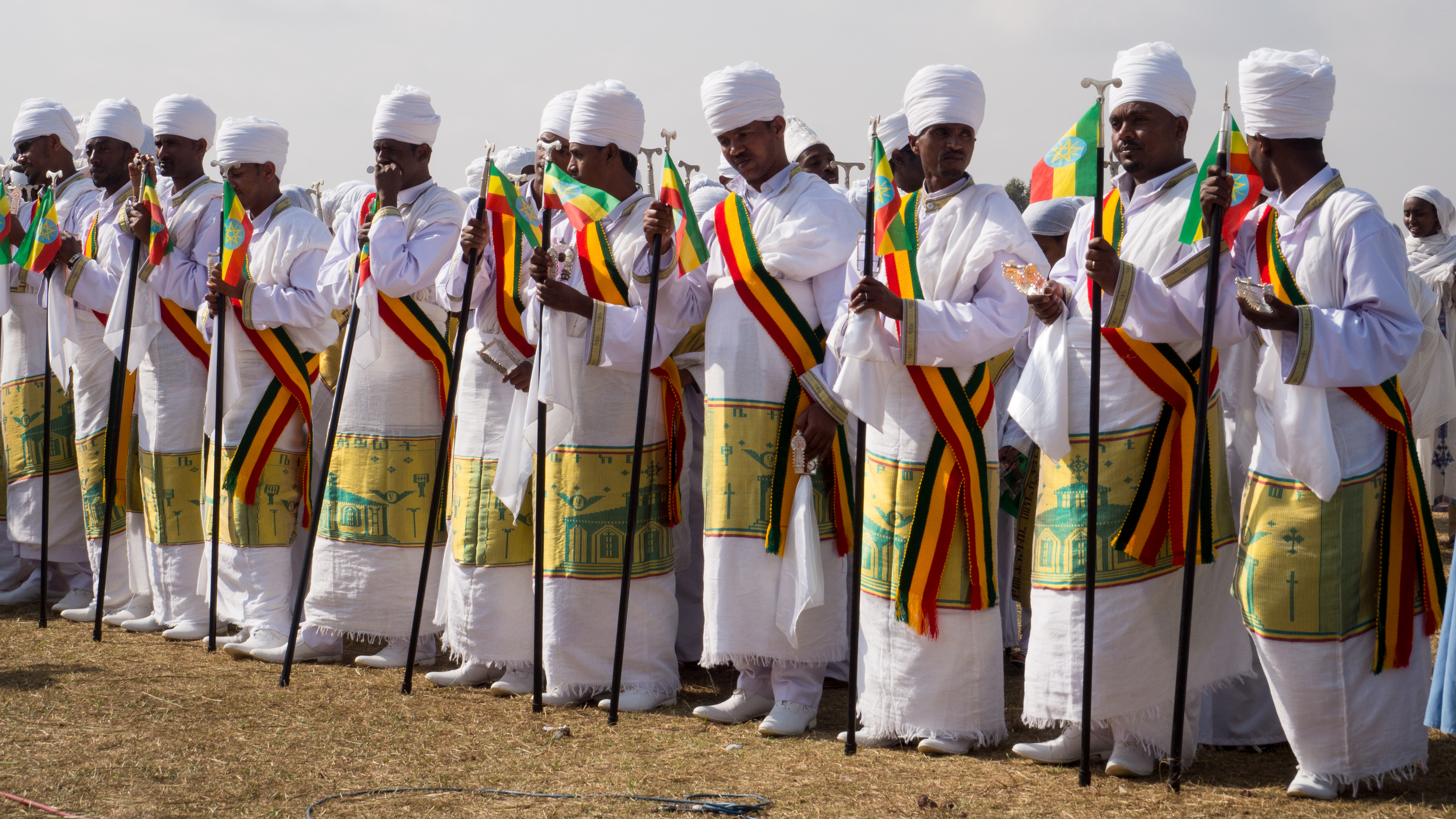
Ethiopian Orthodox priests singing during 2015 Timkat celebration

Common musical instruments features on Orthodox Tewahedo music is tsenatsil (sistrum), kebero (hand drum) and hand bell. The three modes of chants with respective services are Ge'ez (ordinary days), Ezel (fast days and Lent), and Araray (principal feasts).

== Zema ==
Zema is long associated with the Ethiopian Orthodox Tewahedo Church since Yared times. Although zema is translates as "a pleasing sound", "song", or "melody", it implicates with text associated with melody, rhythmic patterns, vocal style, music instruments and liturgical dance. Therefore, it is essential to religious life in highland Ethiopia. Since Christianity was accepted in the Kingdom of Aksum in the 4th century, Zema has been widely incorporated with the music of the Ethiopian Orthodox Church.

Zema also preserved among the Ethiopian Jews drawing to Christians in modern Ethiopia.

The Ethiopian Orthodox Tewahedo Church made its music in religious adapting services, to season of the ecclesiastical year and to solemnity of the feast, making celebratory on festivals and mourning service. Adoration, thanksgiving, supplication, sorrow, joy and triumph are found in zema.

== Liturgy ==
Liturgy is very important to Orthodox Tewahedo music. In 1 Cor.11:23-25, all types of Orthodox prayer and ritual cluster around the Sacrifice of the Mass which was instituted by the Lord the same night in which He was betrayed.

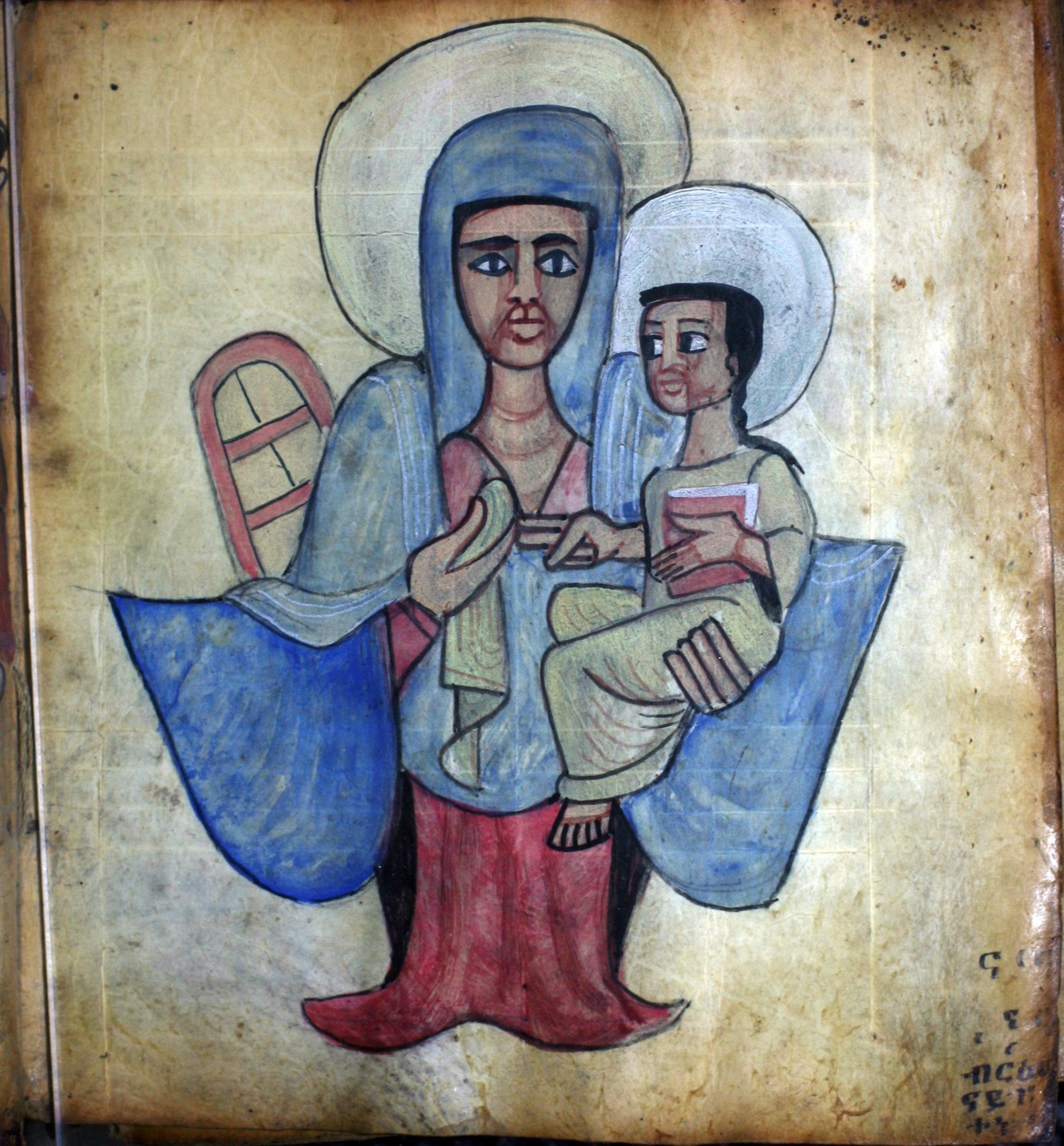
Ge'ez prayer book dated 15th century

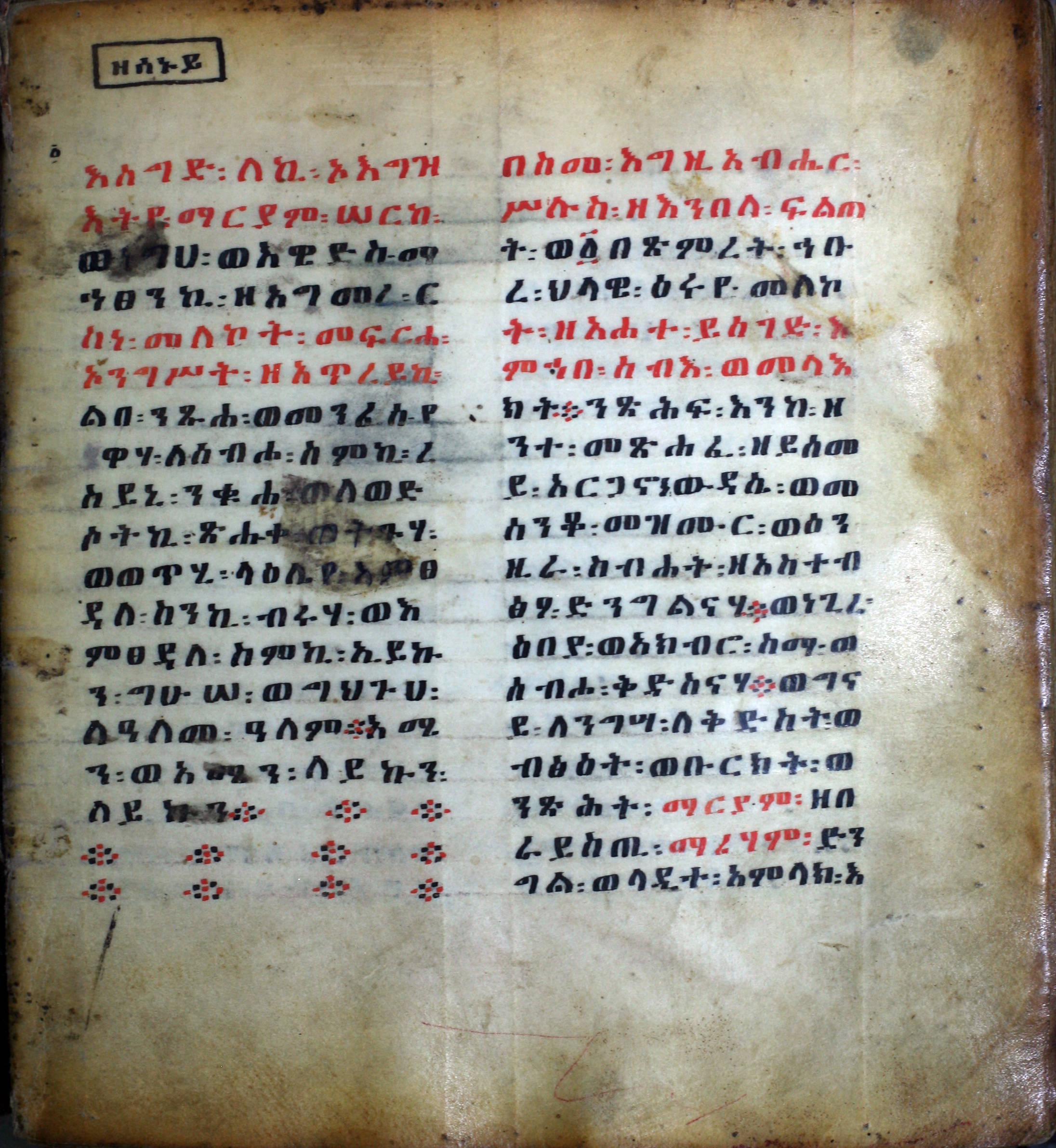
Ge'ez writing from 15th century Ethiopian Coptic book

The Ethiopian liturgy is divided into two groups: one is the introductory called Ordo Communis and Eucharistic part called Anaphora. The Anaphora is central part of solemn of the liturgy, and the great Oblation is central point. It starts with the words "Sursum Corda", or with their equivalent, and encompasses all liturgies that includes all service to the end. The Anaphora corresponds to Western canon, which is invariable to common framework, the Ordo Communis. The phrase "Qidase of St. Dioscorus" means the variable part, either Anaphora, which bears the name of Saint, or Ordo Communis together with the same Anaphoras.

The Anaphoras are typically fourteen, the basic normal use being that of the Twelve Apostles. In ancient times, six Anaphoras had been used by many monasteries and the Ethiopic liturgy was first of all published Oriental Liturgies. It was printed in Rome in 1548.

== Official anaphoras ==
The 14 anaphoras are:

1. Of the Apostles
2. Of our Lord Jesus Christ
3. Of our Lady Mary
4. Of St. John Chrysostom
5. Of St. Dioscorus
6. Of St. John the Evangelist
7. Of St. Gregory the Armenian
8. Of the 318 Orthodox
9. Of St. Athanasius
10. Of St. Basil
11. Of St. Gregory of Nazianzus
12. Of St. Epiphanius
13. Of St. Cyril
14. Of James Serugh

There are 14 Anaphoras, but the one is normally used while the alternate being used for rare occasions. The Twelve Apostles is the normal one and fundamentally identical with the Coptic Liturgy Of St. Cyril, although much were developed. The majority of Anaphoras are lately developed apparently from the tenth century.

The Anaphora of Our Lord is dedicated to feast of Our Lord and on Mount Tabor; Our Lady on the feast of Virgin Mary; Gabriel and Dacesius; John the Son of Thunder on the feast of John the Evangelist; Saint Steven; Saint George, all Christian martyrs and Christmas; John Chrysostom on vigil of Passover; Day of Our Savior, Feast of Cross, feast of John Chrysostom; Athanasius on Christian Sabbath; Epiphanius on Baptism day, the month of Rains; the 318 Nicean Fathers on feasts of Kana of Galilee, Gena, 24 Heavenly Priests; Gregory Nazianzen, Hosanna Feast and at Passion; Dioscorus on Ascension, Pentecost; Basil, feasts of all Patriarchs and Bishops; Cyril, on feast of Cyril the Patriarch and feasts of all the righteous and prophets; James Serug, on St. Michael and St. Gabriel, all Angels.

Liturgy is conducted daily with priests and requires three deacon. The Ethiopic liturgy is a product of Saint Mark, a rite used in Coptic Orthodox Church, and divided into two Anaphoras; pre-anaphoras and anaphora itself.

== Saint Yared ==
The 6th century Aksumite composer Yared invented Deggua or hymnary. During this period, hymns have been added by various composers. Yared's assumption to the Heaven were imparted to Mezegeba Deggua (Treasury of Plainsongs). In this part, he invented three mode of chanting used by the Church: Geez, Ezil, Araray.

Besides Deggua, there are collections of hymns such as "Praise of Mary" and the "Organ of the Virgin" or "organ of Praises". These are collections of hymns of Virgin Mary arranged in different days of the week. "Psalter of Christ" is another similar collection. The Antiphony of the church is known as Meweset (Answers), consists of anthems of special festivals throughout the year. Meraf also another hymn or chant dedicated for festivals of the year. Qene is form of hymns or poems which is extemporized, while Selam and Melkea also used optionally.

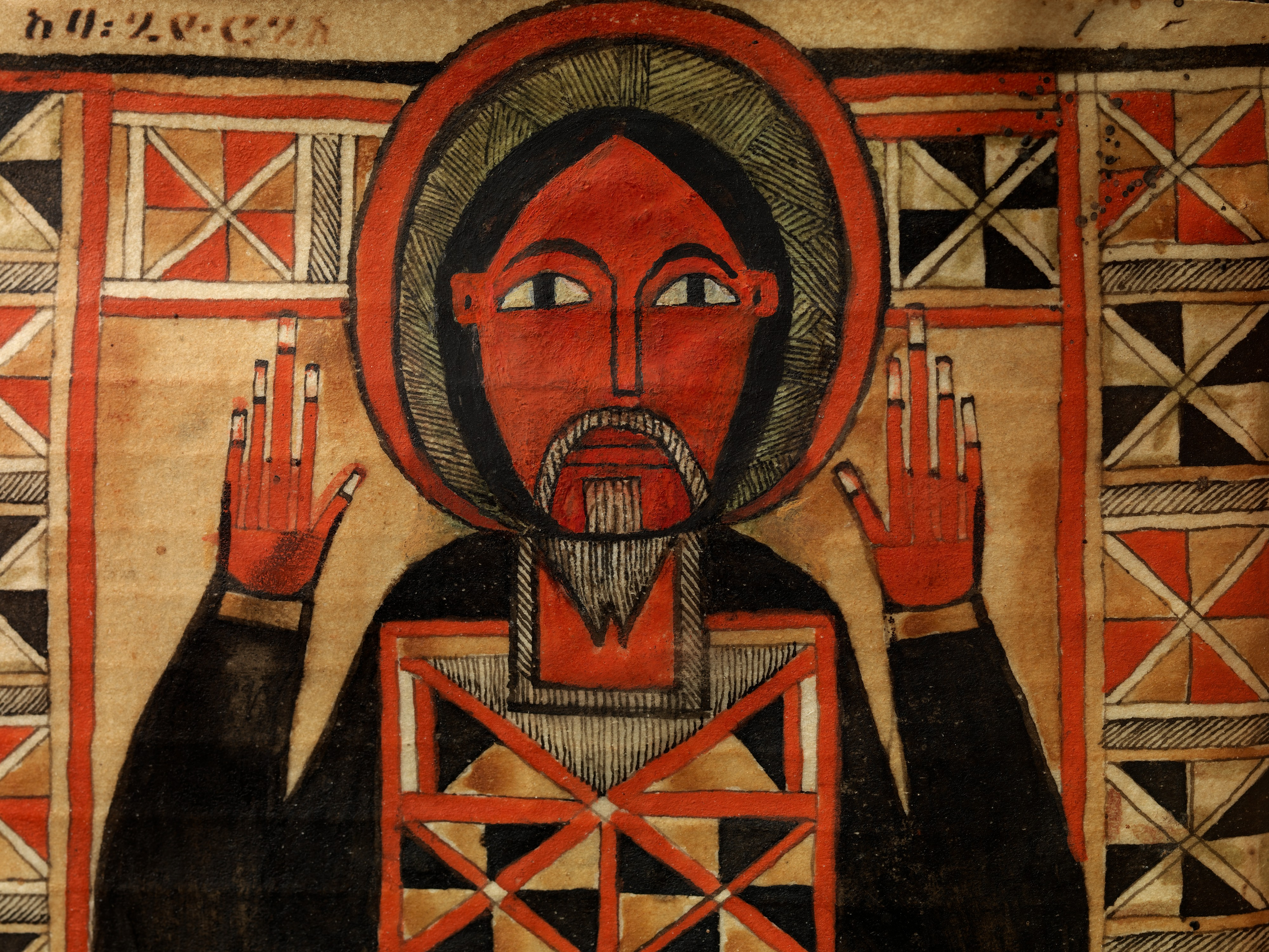
Book of Se'atat author Giyorgis of Gesecha

In the music of church, instruments include tsenatsil, a type of sistrum, kebero, a large drum and hand bell is typical. Three modes are used: Ge'ez for (ordinary days), Ezel for fast days and during Lent, and Araray is for principal feasts.

== Se'atat ==
The 15th century scholar Abba Giyorgis of Gesecha developed Se'atat (Horologium) for day and night, which then followed by addition of hymns and prayers. Se'atat is regularly conducted by monks, priests and deacons while debteras conducting difference service.

The Book of Se'atat contains the great public prayers of the church, but likely offered in the name of the church. The book enumerated at a stated hour in church, monasteries and outside. Se'atat is divided into seven parts also known as Night, Prime, Terce, Sext, None, Vespers, and compline. These are together called one "hour". The next division is prime or first because it is said at "first hour" or sun rise. Then Terce is third, recited as third hour; Sext or sixth at noon; none or night at three O'clock; Vespers is the next, signifying the evening service followed by compline or the completion.
