= Calendar of saints (Orthodox Tewahedo) =

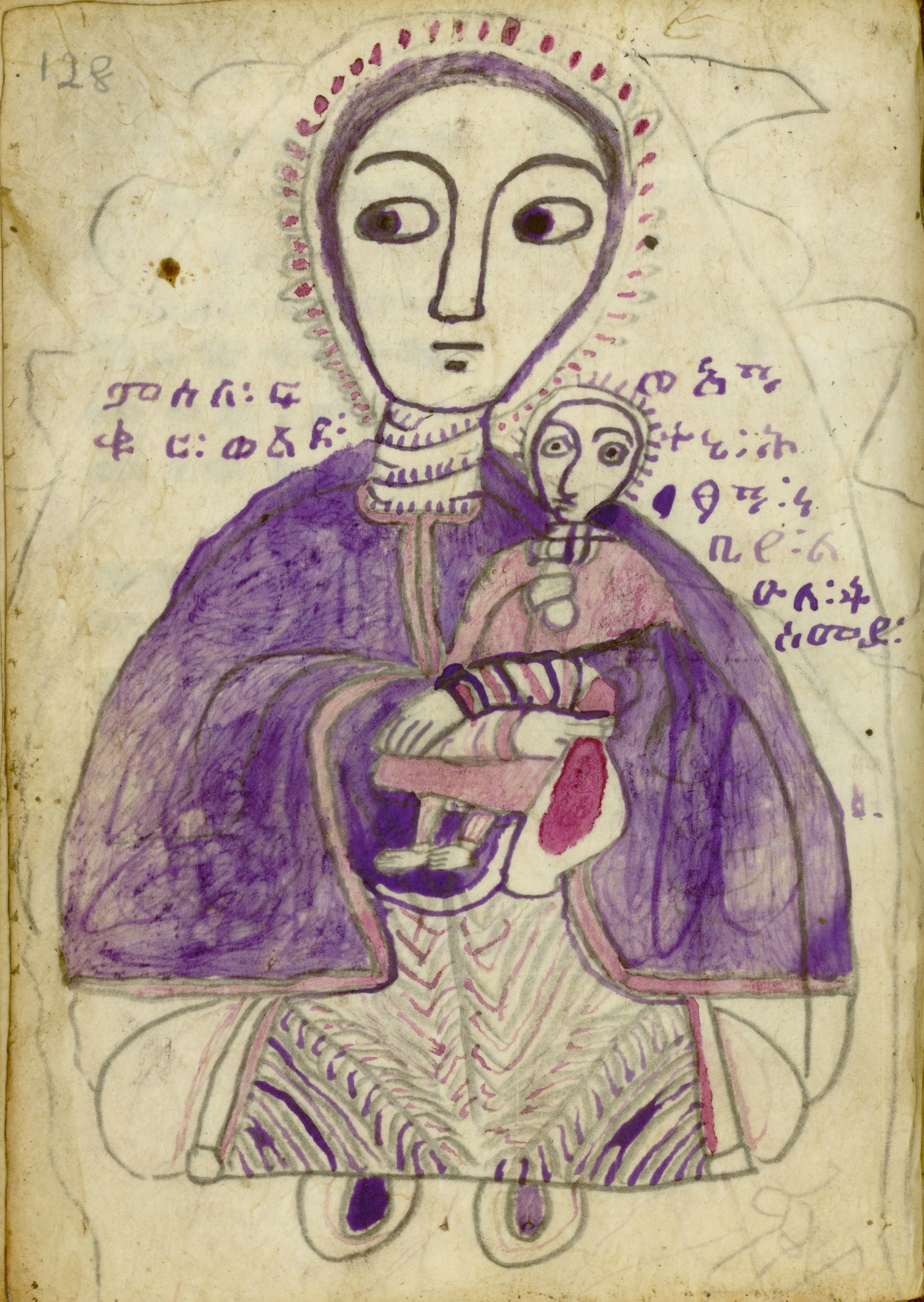
Drawing of Mary, mother of Jesus, 'with her beloved son,' from a Geʽez manuscript copy of Weddasé Māryām, circa 1875

The following list contains calendar of saints observed by the Orthodox Tewahedo Church, the Ethiopian Orthodox Tewahedo Church and Eritrean Orthodox Tewahedo Church. It includes both annual feast days and calendar of saints by month.

== Annual feasts ==
- November 30 – Saint Mary
- August 7–22 – Filseta
- May 9 – Lideta Maryam
- November 21 and June 19 – Michael the Archangel
- November 6 and April 5 - The Feast of The Savior Of The World
- October 15 - The Birth Of Abune Gebremenfes Qidus
- March 13 - The Death of Abune Gebremenfes Qidus

== Regular saint days per month ==
Days per month (using the Ethiopian calendar)	Dedicated saint(s)
1st	Lideta (Birth of the Holy Virgin Mary) and Elias (Elijah)
2nd	Thaddius
3rd	Be'eta (Presentation of the Holy Virgin to the Temple of Jerusalem)
4th	Yohannes Wolde Negedquad (John Son of Thunder)
5th	Petros and Paulos (Peter and Paul) and Gebre Menfes Kiddus
6th	Our Lady of Qusquam (Egypt)
7th	Holy Trinity Day
8th	Kiros (Cyrus) and Abba Banuda
9th	Thomas (not the Apostle)
10th	Kidus Meskel (Feast of the Holy Cross)
11th	Hanna we Iyaqem (St Anne and St. Joachim, parents of the Holy Virgin Mary) and Fasilides
12th	Michael the Archangel, Samuel, and Yared
13th	Feast of Igziabher Ab (God the Father) and Raphael the Archangel
14th	Abuna Aregawi and Gebre Kristos
15th	Kirkos and his mother Iyeluta (Cyricus and Julitta)
16th	Kidane Mihret (Our Lady Covenant of Mercy)
17th	Estifanos (Stephen the Martyr) and Abba Gerima
18th	Ewostatewos
19th	Gabriel the Archangel
20th	Hnstata
21st	Holy Virgin Mary, Mother of God
22nd	Deqsius, Uriel the Archangel
23rd	Georgis (Saint George)
24th	Abune Tekle Haymanot
25th	Merkorios (Saint Mercurius)
26th	Thomas the Apostle
27th	Medhane Alem (Savior of the World) ...
28th	Immanuel
29th	Bale Wold (Feast of God the Son) Kidist Arsema
30th	Markos (Mark the Evangelist)
