= Ethiopian talismanic scrolls =

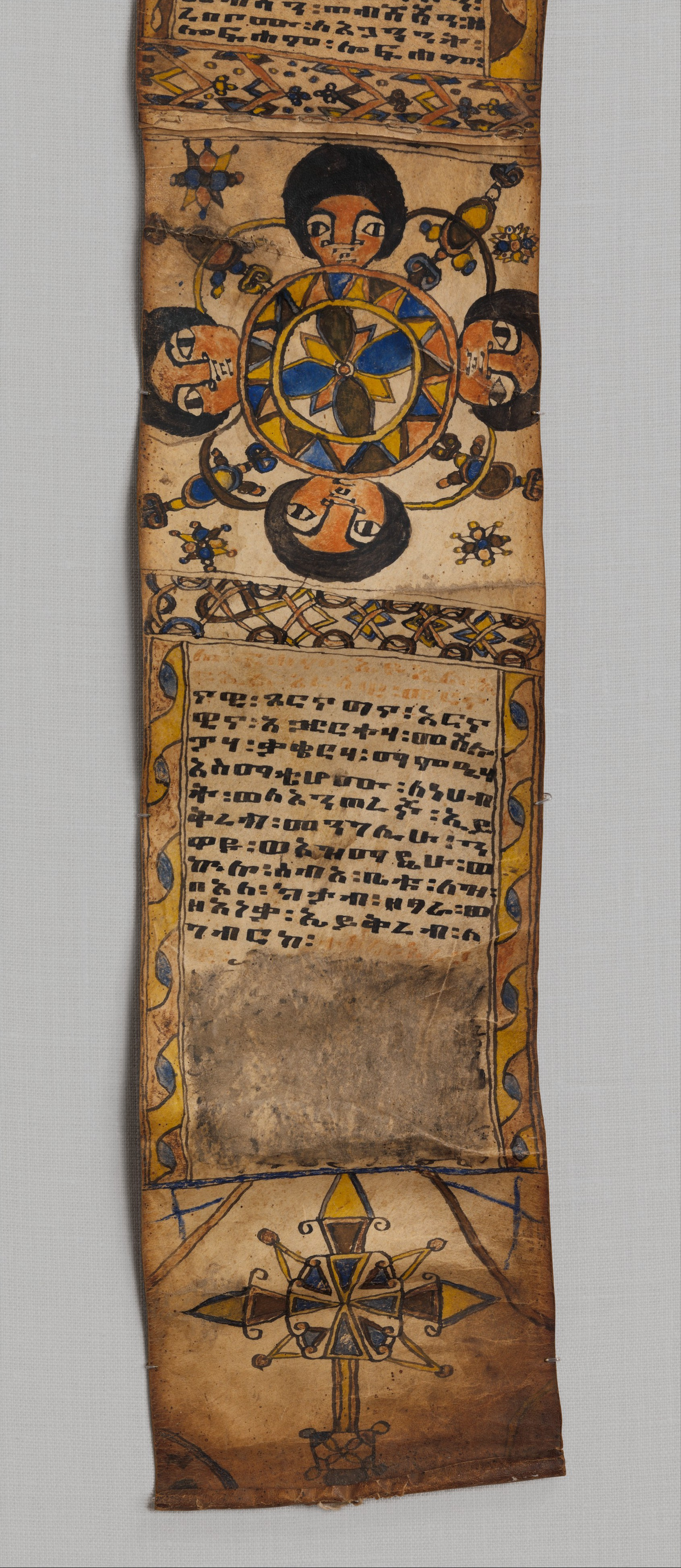
Ethiopian talismanic scroll from the 18th-19th century. Made of parchment, pigments and cotton. The dimensions are 192 x 17 cm. The Metropolitan Museum of Art accession number: 2012.5.

Ethiopia has a complex religious history, experiencing Christian rule in the 4th century, then experiencing increasing Islamic influence in the 8th century. The earliest extant Ethiopian talismanic scrolls (Amharic: የብራና ክታብ) date to the 16th century, but are thought to be in use since the 10th century. The scrolls are an intermingling of all the Abrahamic faiths with indigenous African roots. As the scrolls are highly personalized, their purposes vary, but serve three broad functions: to protect and heal, to exert external influence, and to practice ritual employment. The scrolls are part of a larger ritual tradition rooted in Christian Exorcism Practices.

The scrolls are written in Geʽez, which has few remaining speakers, but is the official liturgical language of the Ethiopian Orthodox Church. To activate the scrolls, a third-party interpreter literate in Geʽez must read the scroll to the afflicted. The scrolls treat illness by extracting demons from the patient's body. They are commissioned by the patient from an unordained religious figure in the Ethiopian Orthodox Church known as a dabtara. Dabtaras craft each scroll to the specialized needs of the patient seeking help, traditionally utilizing animal hide. The creation process involves a sacrificial ritual to obtain the hide, with the animal symbolizing the afflicted patron of the scroll.

== Primary uses ==
Ethiopian talismanic scrolls served three main functions: protection and healing of one's self, exerting external influence, and practical ritual employment.

The healing functions of these scrolls were often utilized in conjunction with homeopathic medicines. In this sense, the talismanic properties of the scroll treat the spiritual cause of an ailment, while the ingestible medicine treats the symptoms of said ailment. To invoke its healing powers, a third-party interpreter must read the scroll to the sick. This is because the majority of these artifacts are written in Ge'ez, a liturgical language with few remaining speakers. Additionally, the sick can drape the scroll around their body or neck, with the expectation that proximity would pull the affliction out of them. The scrolls are similarly worn for protection, warding off several potential threats, ranging in severity from bed bugs, to home intruders, to smallpox.

Talismanic scrolls are also used as devices for controlling external factors and affecting others. In this application, talismanic scrolls functioned with both positive and malicious intent. With positive intentions, scrolls can be created and invoked to fortify one's physical health, protect one's kin, and ward off the evil eye. For malicious functions, talismanic scrolls are sometimes used to control the will of others, forcing the victim to obey the wearer.

Ethiopian Talismanic scrolls have practical remedial functions within ritual contexts as well. In this pantheon of remedial applications, these scrolls possess the capacity to aid in the exorcism of demons. By presenting the patient with a scroll, the demon is stirred and forced to leave the body of the afflicted. The process is not easy on the patient, who would often "be afraid and cry out".

== User description ==
Patrons of talismanic scrolls were involved in a deeply personal, ritualistic scroll-making process, which amalgamates astrological practice and personalized protection against evil.

Crafted by dabtaras, each scroll is customized in accordance to a patron's astrologically derived guidelines. The scroll-making process is a ritual of its own, engendering a symbolic relationship between scroll and patron by sacrificing the animal (often goat or sheep) to represent the afflicted. In crafting this spiritually protective connection, a patron must be rubbed by and bathed in the contents of the animal. Following the parchment process, scrolls are measured and cut based on the desired function of the patron. Scrolls cut to the height of a patient provide head-to-toe protection and are typically hung around the neck or in a case, while lengthier scrolls are hung up on walls to ward off demons.

Talismanic scrolls with Islamic influence may contain apotropaic prayers drawn from the Qur'an to expel ailments and demons. Many of the verses inscribed on talismans are obtained through divinatory practices. For example, the numerical alignment of a name with an astrological sign or divination table readings are used to determine the elements incorporated in a client's scroll.

While talismanic scrolls generally had a multitude of functions, historical manuscripts display a majority use in women's health conditions: namely childbirth, menstruation, miscarriages, and infertility. This suggests a greater attentiveness to women and reproductive health, reflecting the broader context of Ethiopian life. The knowledge of Ethiopian scroll commissioners otherwise remains enigmatic.

== Iconography ==
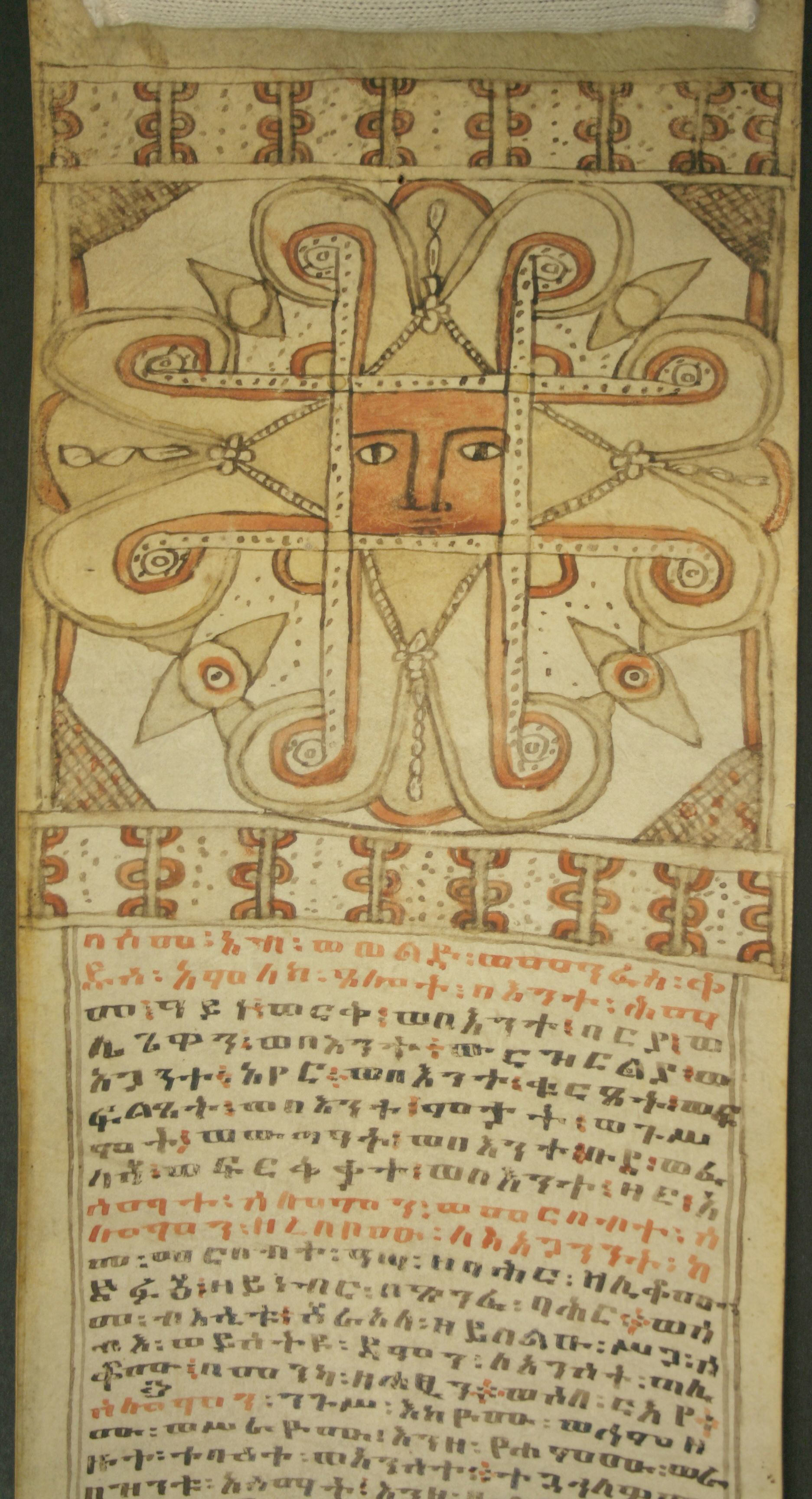
19th century Ethiopian Healing Scroll from The Metropolitan Museum of Art. Scroll made of animal hide and pigment, W. 6 x L. 78 in. (15.24 x 198.12 cm).

The iconography of the scrolls includes important symbols, common colors, and the association between gaze and eyes. Talismans and representational images coexist on most scrolls.

Common figures in these scrolls are crosses and a face within an eight-pointed star. The cross is an object of veneration in Ethiopia, separating Christians from Muslims, while the eight-pointed star is a common ancient motif. The eight points refer to the four directions of the talisman's protection, while the face, known as gätsä säb' e ("face of a person") relates to the prayer that goes with the talisman. Other common symbols are X's, small checks with prayers, and angels. The scrolls also feature magic squares, ciphers, and angelic and divine names.

Gazing as a mode of activation is rooted in Islamic healing practices, and eyes play a prominent role in these talismans. Eyes may not always be depicted with other parts of the body, but they are never isolated; they fit within geometric motifs in pairs, symmetrically and obliquely, within the composition's axes. In this way, an eye can sometimes represent a whole figure. Within Ethiopian culture in general, eyes represent beauty and hold power. They also symbolize divine light that drives away the darkness of demons and disease.

The use of color in scrolls suggests a figurative logic, emphasizing a tendency to interpret seals in portrait terms. Common colors are black, white, red, blue, green, and yellow. Eyes and the ornamentation around them are frequently rimmed with red. Faces are also often painted red, a result of painters in the fifteenth century attempting to depict flesh tones through the utilization of pink ochre. On the other hand, points of stars and clothing tend to be painted blue.
