= Ethiopian chant =

Liturgical chant used by the Ethiopian Orthodox Tewahedo Church

Ethiopian liturgical chant
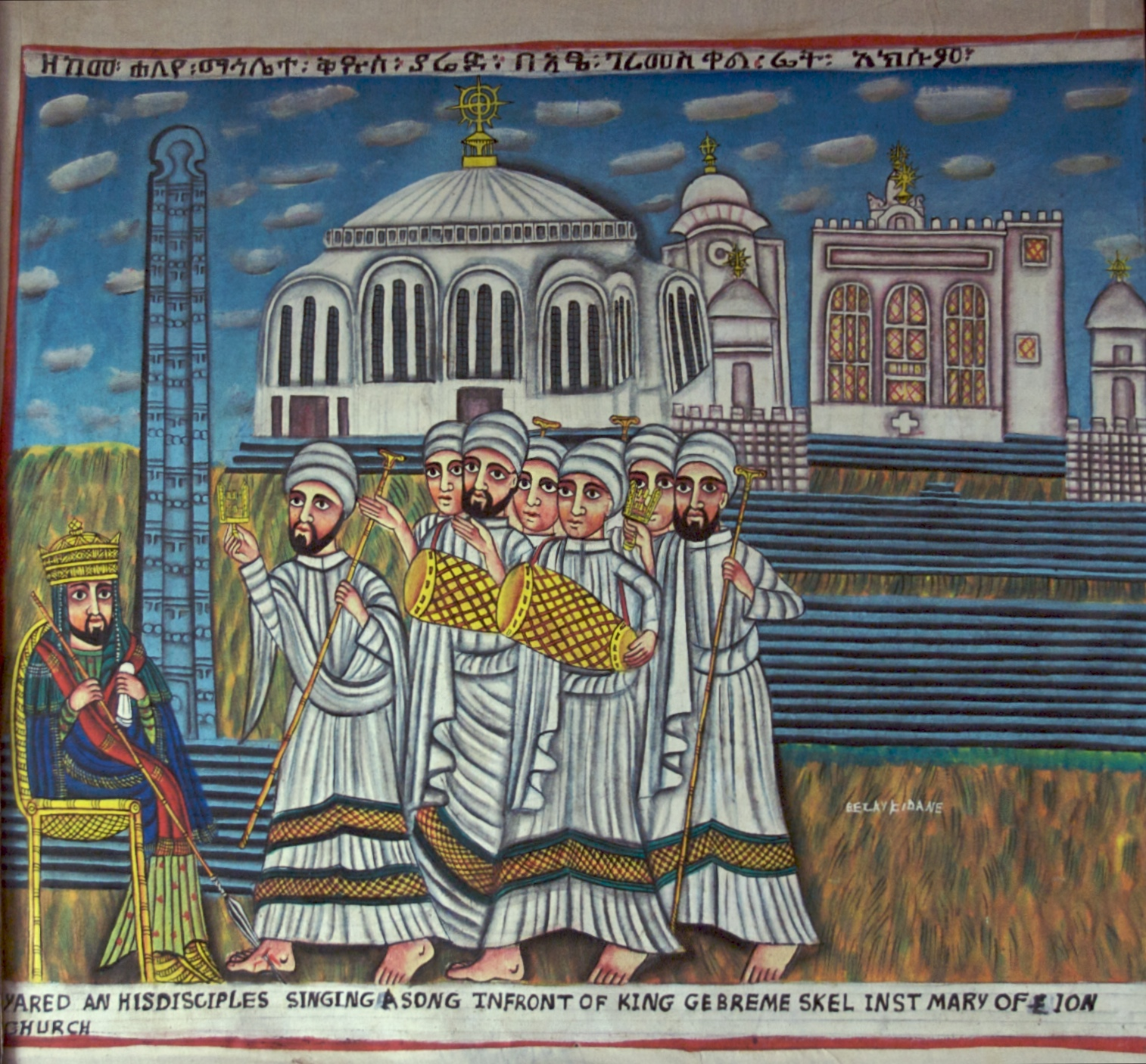
- Saint Yared and his disciples singing with the Church of Our Lady Mary of Zion and the Axum Obelisk in the Background
- Native name: Zema
- Stylistic origins: Ancient liturgical chant
- Cultural origins: Ethiopian Orthodox Tewahedo Church
- Typical instruments: Kebero; drums; tsanatsel; sistrum; mequamia

Ethiopian liturgical chant, or Zema, is a form of Christian liturgical chant practiced by the Ethiopian Orthodox Tewahedo Church. The related musical notation is known as melekket. The tradition began after the sixth century and is traditionally identified with Saint Yared. Through history, the Ethiopian liturgical chants have undergone an evolution similar to that of European liturgical chants.

== Etymology ==
Zema means a pleasing sound, a song or a melody in Geʽez, the liturgical language of the Ethiopian Orthodox Tewahedo Church.

== History ==
Saint Yared has been credited with the invention of the musical tradition of Ethiopian liturgical chants. Yared, who lived in the sixth century, represents the first known case of indigenous Ethiopian musical notation and religious music. According to Ethiopian Christian tradition St. Yared was divinely inspired to create three forms of chanting. The story of his inspiration follows St. Yared watched a small insect fall from a tree and then climb to a greater height up the tree than the insect had been at before, leading St. Yared to theorize a human could accomplish much more. According to tradition, from that moment onward St. Yared began to take inspiration from the beauty of nature and the singing of birds to create his chants. Thus it is said that “even the sounds of animals and the songs of the birds, fall under one of these modes of St. Yared. They are known as ararai, ezil and geeze. Each of these chants is associated with an aspect of the Holy Trinity. The geeze is associated with the Father, the ararai with the Holy Spirit, and the ezil with the Son. The geeze are the most often used chants and are frequently performed with the ararai on non-feast days. The Ezel chants which are often much slower and are performed on holidays, at vigils, funerals, and Good Friday. The Synaxarium of the Ethiopian Church attests that Ethiopian liturgical chants are faithful to Yared and divine in nature.

By the beginning of the sixth century, in Yared's lifetime, Ethiopia had been Christianized. Around that period, the Ethiopian Orthodox Tewahedo Church already had a corpus of prayers. Ethiopian liturgical chants were developed only after that. Book of Deggua, Ethiopian antiphons, in particular are of much later origin, dating from the second half of the 16th century. Most of the Ethiopian Highlands had been Miaphysite Christian since the fourth century. Ancient chanted liturgy with congregation participating with clapping, ululation and rhythmic movements has been retained from that era.

Ethiopian liturgical chants are based on both written and oral sources, but the isolation of Ethiopia and the lack of source material make it difficult to reconstruct the exact history of Ethiopian church music.

The musical notation (melekket) used for the chants, is not a typical notational system since it does not represent pitch or melody. Rather, it is as a mnemonic. Most studies conclude that there has been impressive consistency since the 1500s. It is likely that Ethiopian liturgical chants have undergone an evolution similar to that of European liturgical chants. It can be assumed that the notations have become more and more complex as time has passed. Regional varieties may have become standardized over time, and more symbols and segments of music have become available for composers.

Any form of Ethiopian gospel music was not recorded until the 1950s when priest Mere Geta Lisanework assisted the Ethiopian Radio in recording.

== Practice ==
External media

Audio
- Abetu Fetariachin by former members of Temero Mastemar and Meserete Haimanot Spiritual Associations choir, London, from http://www.ethiopianorthodox.org, retrieved 1 April 2017
- Meskle Teshekemen, St. Mary Ethiopian Orthodox Tewahedo Church in Los Angeles, from http://www.ethiopianorthodox.org, retrieved 1 April 2017

Video
- Saint Yared's Hymn for the Feast of Saint Stephen on YouTube, recorded by Beide Mariam Ejigu Retta at St Stephen's Church in Addis Ababa, retrieved 1 April 2017

Students of Ethiopian liturgical chants study the Geʽez language, and begin to practice singing at no later than five years of age in a local elementary school called nebab bet. Here the students undergo five stages of training where they are expected to commit to memory passages of the bible such as the First Epistle of St. John, the Acts of the Apostles, and, most importantly, the Dawit (The Psalms of David). The students remain in elementary school until they are about 12 years of age and have completely memorized and mastered the recitation of the Dawit. Upon this completion a singing student who wishes to become a singer (däbtära) will seek out further education. Education takes place in liturgical dance schools called aqwaqwam bét and includes, in addition to singing and dancing, training in traditional instruments such as the kebero, drums, tsanatsel, sistrum, and mequamia. Singing students (däqä mermur) become singers (däbtära) and some will eventually become masters (märigéta). A student is considered ready when he has mastered the complicated genre of qené. It has been suggested by Ugo Monneret de Villard that liturgical dance, that always accompanies the music, has its origins in the Ancient Egyptian dance.

Ethiopian Orthodox Christians form approximately 43.5% of the population of modern day Ethiopia. Ethiopian Church music remains tightly bounded within the communities and rarely attracts attention by outsiders. Ethiopian Christian music is largely sustained by communities of descent.

=== United States ===
Since the mid-1970s, large-scale emigration of Ethiopians has created a diaspora in the United States. The emigrants brought their secular and liturgical music traditions with them. There is a large concentration of qualified priests (qes) and musicians (däbtära) in Washington, D.C. Both traditional zema and popular songs are performed in these churches. The popular songs, which be stylistically similar to the songs of St. Yared, are written by deacons or someone well-versed in church theology and performed only after being approved by the local church. However, Ethiopian Churches in smaller communities face challenges in maintaining the liturgical cycle and musical tradition.

== Notational system ==
Terms for rates of speed
1. Mereged	Comparable to largo and grave. Very slow.
2. Nuis-mereged	Comparable to adagio. Slow.
3. Abiy-tsefat	Comparable to allegretto. Moderately fast.
4. Tsefat	Comparable to allegro. Fast.
5. Arwasti	Comparable to prestissimo. Very fast.

Notational signs (ቅርጽ)
1. Yizet (ይዘት)	᎐	Comparable to staccato.
2. Deret (ደረት)	᎑	Low and deep voice. Humming at the lowest range of the male voice.
3. Kinat (ቅናት)	᎕	Comparable to upward glissando.
4. Chiret (ጭረት)	᎖	Comparable to downward glissando.
5. Difat (ድፋት)	᎔	Usually means a change to an octave lower.
6. Kurt (ቁርጥ)	᎙	Comparable to coda.
7. Rikrik (ርክርክ)	᎓	Comparable to tremolo.
8. Hidet (ሂደት)	᎗	Comparable to simultaneous accelerando, crescendo and portamento.

== See also ==
- Coptic music
- Giyorgis of Segla
