= Debtera =

Itinerant intellectual religious figure in the Orthodox Tewahedo Church

A debtera (or dabtara; Ge'ez/Tigrinya/Amharic: ደብተራ (Däbtära); plural, Ge'ez\Tigrinya: debterat, Amharic: debtrawoch) is an itinerant religious figure in the Ethiopian and Eritrean Orthodox Tewahedo churches, and the Beta Israel. Etymologically derived from the Ge'ez word for "tent" or "tabernacle" (referencing the biblical Tabernacle or Tent of Congregation), the term primarily denotes a lay scholar who is trained in church literature, liturgical hymns(Zema), and/or Tekle Aquaquam (Ge'ez: ተክለ አቋቋም). They may in fact be officially ordained as deacons, or may act outside the church hierarchy.

== Official education and duties ==
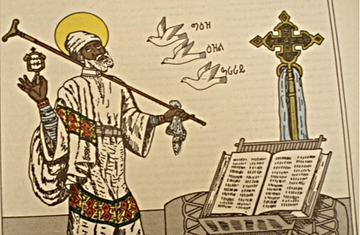
According to Christian tradition, Saint Yared is credited with the development of the liturgical chant system of the EOTC.

Debteras are usually chosen from families of other debteras, and are trained from childhood as scribes (learning Geʽez) and as cantors. They are often taught traditional medicine and lay rites as well. While studying, they often live by begging, retailing, or practicing traditional medicine. The main purpose for their studies, however, is written and oral lore pertaining to religious functions, and the test for graduation is memorizing the psalter. Before services, they bathe and don white clothing, turbans, and a loose striped over-garment called a shamma. Debteras carry prayer sticks to the service, where they sing, dance, and play drums and sistra outside the church or the synagogue during religious services.

Priests (Beta Israel equivalent Kahens) and debteras are two separate professions, though it is possible to pursue both roles. The Orthodox Tewahedo churches see the division between a priest and a debtera as following the model used by the ancient Israelites.

=== Debteras in the Ethiopian Church ===
During Lenten services, debteras tap prayer sticks to keep the rhythm. The Ethiopian Church condones the performances of debteras, citing the story in 2 Kings of David dancing at the temple and Psalm 47:1 ("O clap your hands") for Biblical examples. These performances also feature symbols connected to the Passion of Jesus: the sistrum's swaying and the beating of the drums represent Christ's swaying while enduring beatings, and the tapping of the prayer sticks represent the flagellation of Christ.

=== Among the Beta Israel ===
Among the Beta Israel, the status of debtera is a milestone in the study to become a kahen. Unlike fully-fledged kahens, who perform none of the functions of the debtera, debteras are closer to the laypeople, often serving as intermediaries between them and the clergy. A kahen who gives up his position or is deposed may serve as a debtera.

== Religio-magical healing ==
Debteras participate in liturgy as singers and musicians and, outside the church religio-magical healers by performing as herbalists, astrologers, fortune-tellers etc. Some Ethiopian authors consider these healers as ‘spiritual healers’ whereas, they are purely religio-magical healers. Some duties taken on by Debteras are not sanctioned by the Ethiopian Church. Many debteras distribute contraceptive herbs to women and perform magic meant to perform contraceptive functions, in contradiction to the Ethiopian Church's modern official stances. Some are also reputed to study black magic invoking demons alongside their more benevolent official learning.

Some Debteras traditionally manufacture apotropaic amulets meant to protect the wearer from evil spirits. These amulets are often made of silver and are noted for their use against the evil eye or buda and against zār spirits. They may also study a variety of anti-magic invocations, prayers, and exorcisms. These exorcisms may include prayers, blessing of holy water (which the possessed person drinks), burning of roots, and incantations from a Magic Star Book. Some amulets may take the form of small scrolls kept in pouches or similar containers, made from the skin of a sacrificed goat or lamb whose blood is used to ritually purify the intended owner. Some practice (or rather circumvent) astrology, by giving unlucky people new stars by changing their names. This may be considered "cheating" by the locals, however. Some Debteras have also been noted to use jimsonweed (Datura stramonium) to cause hallucinations.

A debtera may charge a fee for his charms, exorcisms, and astrological practices, but not liturgical activities.

Not all of the Debteras duties and cures are supernatural. Debteras place scarecrows in farm fields to protect them and shave heads to prevent head louse outbreaks. Before the Ethiopian Revolution, nobles would often hire Debteras to educate their children.

Major theological difference in the healing practices of priests or kahens and debteras is that for the priests/kahens, sin versus virtue or evil spirits versus God is the basis for any sickness and healing. Therefore, they prescribe prayer, holy water, baptism, fasting, and penance as a remedy. For the debteras it is evil spirit versus human beings; almost all the sicknesses are possession of evil spirits or caused by evil spirits, therefore, prayer and holy water become the integral part of any ritualistic religious healing ceremony. Besides these, kitab or amulets are also prepared and given by them to be worn to ward away the evil spirits and the buda.

On the other hand, the priests or kahens use the practice of confession, fasting, penance and church attendance as a means of healing together with some sort of advice and guidance. The soul-father, called yenafs abbat, is a kind of family spiritual-doctor, common in many places makes frequent visits to the home and performs services as required.

== See also ==
- Ethiopian chant (Zema)
