= Zema (name) =

Zema is both a surname and a given name. Notable people with the name include:

- Zema Abbey (born 1977), English former professional footballer
- Romeu Zema, Brazilian politician
- Karim Ben Zema, French professional footballer
- Abdullah Abu Zema, Jordanian association football coach
- Joseph Zema (born 1994), Australian Canadian football player

== Other uses ==
- Ethiopian chant, liturgical song also called a Zema
