= Book of Deggua =

Hymnbook developed by Aksumite composer Yared

The Book of Deggua (Ge'ez: መፅሃፈ ድጓ, romanized: mes’hafe dəgwa "Book of Lamentation") is a hymnbook used in the Ethiopian and Eritrean Orthodox Tewahedo Churches. It was developed by the 6th-century composer Yared. The great Deggua is called Mahlete Yared (treasury).

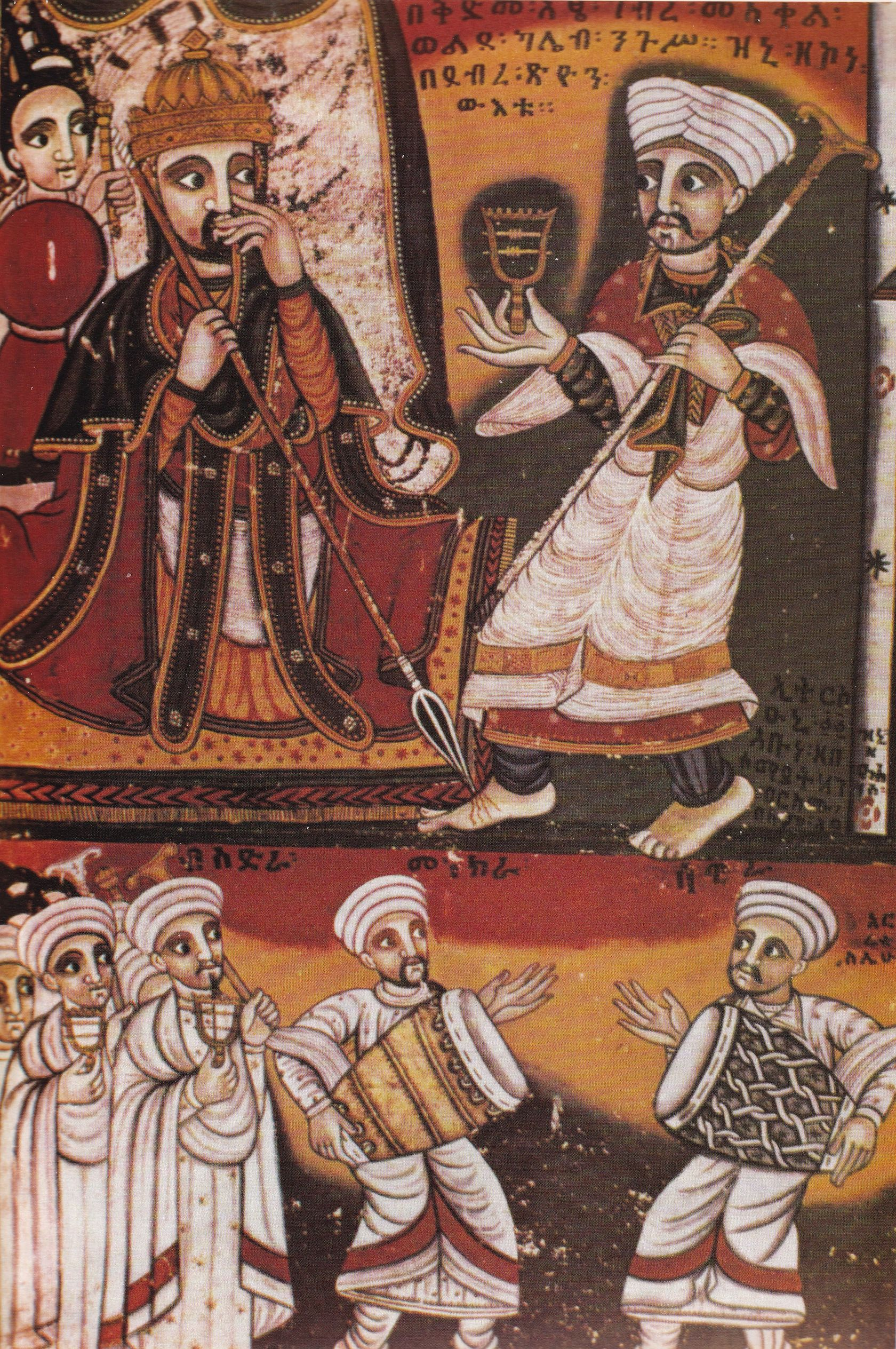
Yared singing before King Gebre Meskel

Yared prepared Deggua in three modes of chanting used by the church, Ge'ez, Ezil and Araray, represent the Trinity: God the Father, God the Son and the Holy Spirit, respectively. Ge'ez is plain chant for ordinary days, Ezil 'measured' is for funerals, and Araray 'lighter' is a free mode for great festivals.

The Degwa contains many passages from the Genesis creation narrative, patristic works, hagiographies, homilies, etc.

== Content ==
The book of Deggua contains Biblical events, passage of sacred books, patristic works, hagiographies, homilies, etc. The book author Yared divided services of the year, not only the seasons, but also with tract of Biblical history. The hymn talks about the Creation, the prophecies related to the birth of Jesus Christ, his life and teachings, and subsequent spread of Christian faith. More essentially, the Antediluvian period minimally written, namely to the act of Creation, the institution of Sabbath, and the building of Noah's Ark.

In the beginning, God made the Heaven and the Earth;

And having completed all, He rested on the Sabbath;

And said He to Noah at the onset of the Flood:

Build yourself an Ark by which you may be saved.

Many hymns are sung months or weeks before and on the eve of Christmas extracted from Psalms and Books of the Prophets or merely slight variations on them. For instance, one hymn can be sung at Christmas Eve in different melodies, with different accompaniments of verse taken from Psalms 68.

The kings of Thrace and the islands offer presents;

The kings of Saba and Arabia bring gifts

To Him born of the Holy Virgin.

A related hymn concerns the Star of Bethlehem:

The star became a guide

And, to them, a herald of joy.

On the Lent which fast are overdone for fifty-six days, hymns are chanted repeatedly to deeper significance, reminiscing the Oriental carving of the Three Monkeys, one covering its eyes the other its mouth, and third its ears.

Let the eyes fast;

Let the tongue fast;

And let the ears fast from hearing evil…

And on the joyous occasion of Easter, the favorite hymn reads:

Christ has risen from the dead

With great power and authority;

He has put Satan in chains;

He has set Adam free

Peace! Henceforth, let there be peace.

Many of Yared's verses are adapted from the Pentateuch, the Psalms, the Book of the Prophets and the New Testament. In such a case, it is temporal order, both over the months and year, and in a single liturgy or choir, which he arranged throughout his life.

== Melodies ==
Yared's three basis melodies are Ge'ez, Ezil and Araray that symbolize the Trinity: God the Father (Ge'ez), the Son (Ezil) and the Holy Spirit (Araray).

1. Ge'ez: is the hard stern, stark and dry. It might be illustrated as commanding, imposing, proclamatory, as elongated reading, as a series of utterances, that are now incantatory and hastily delivered, or suddenly slowly intonated.

2. Ezil: is soft and gentle. It is naturally sentimental giving sense to Christian teachings of Love. It is tender, mellow and comforting.

3. Araray: is often described as plaintive, approaching too melancholic. It is usually sung during gloomy seasons, and remembrance of Lent, especially in Passion Week, or the chant of funeral use this mode. Many labeled its etymology "evoked compassion", "evoked pity", making it plaintive and almost melancholic quality.
