= Ugo Monneret de Villard =

Italian archaeologist, art historian, and Orientalist

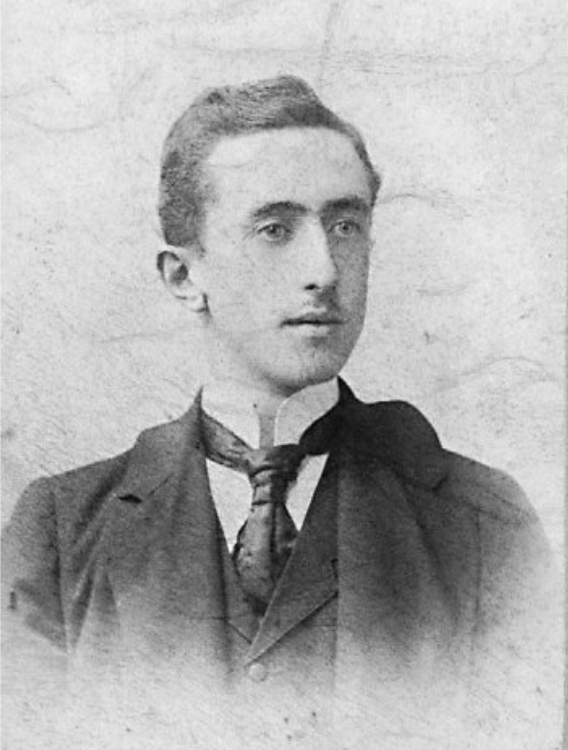
An 1898 photograph of a young Ugo Monneret de Villard

Ugo Monneret de Villard (16 January 1881 – 4 November 1954) was an Italian engineer, archaeologist, orientalist, historian, and art critic. He was a specialist on Islamic art, Eastern Christian art, and the larger interplay of knowledge and art between Europe and the Near East in the medieval era. He assembled an extensive collection and record of Egyptian and Nubian art during his work in Egypt and Sudan for the Italian Ministry of Foreign Affairs.

== Biography ==
Ugo Monneret de Villard was born in Milan, Italy on 16 January 1881 to a family of Burgundian origins from Piedmont, where they had moved during the French Revolution. He attended the Polytechnic University of Milan for his studies. He graduated in 1904 as a chemical industrial engineer. However, he had also nurtured a study of the arts at the same period, studying under Camillo Boito, who similarly combined a love of engineering with a love of architecture and art. He studied the history of architecture and medieval architecture specifically. He also did scholarship on the history of Italian art and Byzantine art. He began to travel in 1908 for his scholarship, largely to Africa and Asia. He acquired a teaching certification at the Polytechnic University, and taught there from 1913 to 1924 in the History of Architecture. Before 1920, his main academic output was in the field of Lombard history.

He began working with the Italian Ministry of Foreign Affairs in 1921, especially in Egypt. This coincided with a shift in his scholarly interests toward Oriental art (in the sense of the "Near East"). His work in Egypt concluded in 1928, and he moved to Anglo-Egyptian Sudan, where he served until 1934. In January–March 1937, he visited Axum in Ethiopia in the aftermath of its Italian conquest. After this finished, he moved his Italian residence from Milan to Rome. In Rome, he largely concentrated on publishing the enormous backlog of work he'd already compiled, rather than doing new travels. Monneret de Villard was the only Italian specialist in Islamic art in the era, and his publications essentially were the entire body of Italian scholarship on the matter.

He taught archaeology for a year at the Sapienza University of Rome in 1944, after the fall of fascism in Rome. There were plans to make a chair for Medieval Oriental art at the university and to assign the position to him, but the plans never came through, and his academic appointment ended. In 1950, he was elected a member of the Accademia dei Lincei. Monneret de Villard died on 4 November 1954. While respected among those who knew his work, he still died "proud and impoverished", with wider recognition of his work only coming late in his life. Despite his work in Africa being technically affiliated with the government, Monneret de Villard had been cool toward the fascist regime, perhaps explaining him not bothering to attempt to gain an academic position in an era where professors were required to swear an oath to fascism.

His archive of collected material and writings was donated by his family to the Archaeology and Art History Library in the Palazzo Venezia, Rome. The Library is run by INASA, the Italian department of architecture and art history. The collection was so overwhelming that David Storm Rice, who was assigned to investigate the boxes of his materials and organize them, died in 1962 without having completed the task.

== Selected works ==
Monneret published over 270 works, including around twenty books and many long essays.

- Giorgione da Castelfranco. Studio critico, Bergamo, 1904.
- (as editor), Note sull'arte di costruire le città, Società Editrice Tecnico Scientifica, Milano 1907.
- (as editor, with Marco Magistretti), Liber Notitiae Sanctorum Mediolani. Manoscritto della Biblioteca Capitolare di Milano, Milano 1917.
- U. Monneret de Villard, A. Patricolo, La Chiesa di Santa Barbara al Vecchio Cairo, Firenze 1922.
- La scultura ad Ahnâs. Note sull'origine dell'arte copta, Milano 1923.
- Les couvents près de Sohâg..., Milano 1925–26.
- Il monastero di S. Simeone presso Aswân, vol. I. Descrizione archeologica, Milano 1927.
- Description générale du monastère de Saint-Siméon..., Les églises du monastère des Syriens au Wâdî en-Natrûn, Milano 1928.
- Deyr el-Muharraqah, Milano 1928.
- La necropoli musulmana di Aswân, Il Cairo 1930.
- Iscrizioni del cimitero di Sakinya, Il Cairo 1933.
- La Nubia medievale, I-II,Il Cairo 1935.
- La Nubia medievale, III-IV, Il Cairo 1957 (posthumous).
- Aksum. Ricerche di topografia generale, Roma 1938.
- Storia della Nubia cristiana, Roma 1938.
- Le chiese della Mesopotamia, Roma 1940.
- La Nubia romana, Roma 1941.
- Lo studio dell'Islam in Europa nel XII e nel XIII secolo, Città del Vaticano 1944.
- Il libro delle peregrinazioni nelle parti d'Oriente..., Roma 1948.
- Liber peregrinationis di Jacopo da Verona, Roma 1950.
- Le pitture musulmane al soffitto della Cappella Palatina di Palermo, Roma 1950.
- Le leggende orientali sui Magi evangelici, Città del Vaticano 1952.
- L'arte iranica, Milano 1954.
