= Orthodox Tewahedo =

Group of Oriental Orthodox churches

Orthodox Tewahedo refers to two Oriental Orthodox Christian churches with shared beliefs, liturgy, and history. The Orthodox Tewahedo biblical canon is common to all churches, as is Orthodox Tewahedo music.

- The Ethiopian Orthodox Tewahedo Church, autocephalous since 1959 from the Coptic Orthodox Church.
- The Eritrean Orthodox Tewahedo Church, autocephalous since 1994 from the Ethiopian Orthodox Tewahedo Church

Tewahedo (Ge'ez: ተዋሕዶ täwaḥədo) is a Ge'ez word meaning 'being made one' or 'unified'. This word refers to the Oriental Orthodox belief in the one composite unified nature of Christ; i.e., a belief that a complete, natural union of the divine and human natures into one is self-evident in order to accomplish the divine salvation of humankind. This position is known as miaphysitism and is in contrast to the "two natures of Christ" belief (truly distinct, but unseparated divine and human natures, called the hypostatic union), which is held by the Catholic Church and the Eastern Orthodox Church.

== See also ==
- Calendar of saints (Orthodox Tewahedo)
- Oriental Orthodox Churches
- Christianity in Ethiopia
