= Yared =

Aksumite saint and composer (505–571)

Saint Yared
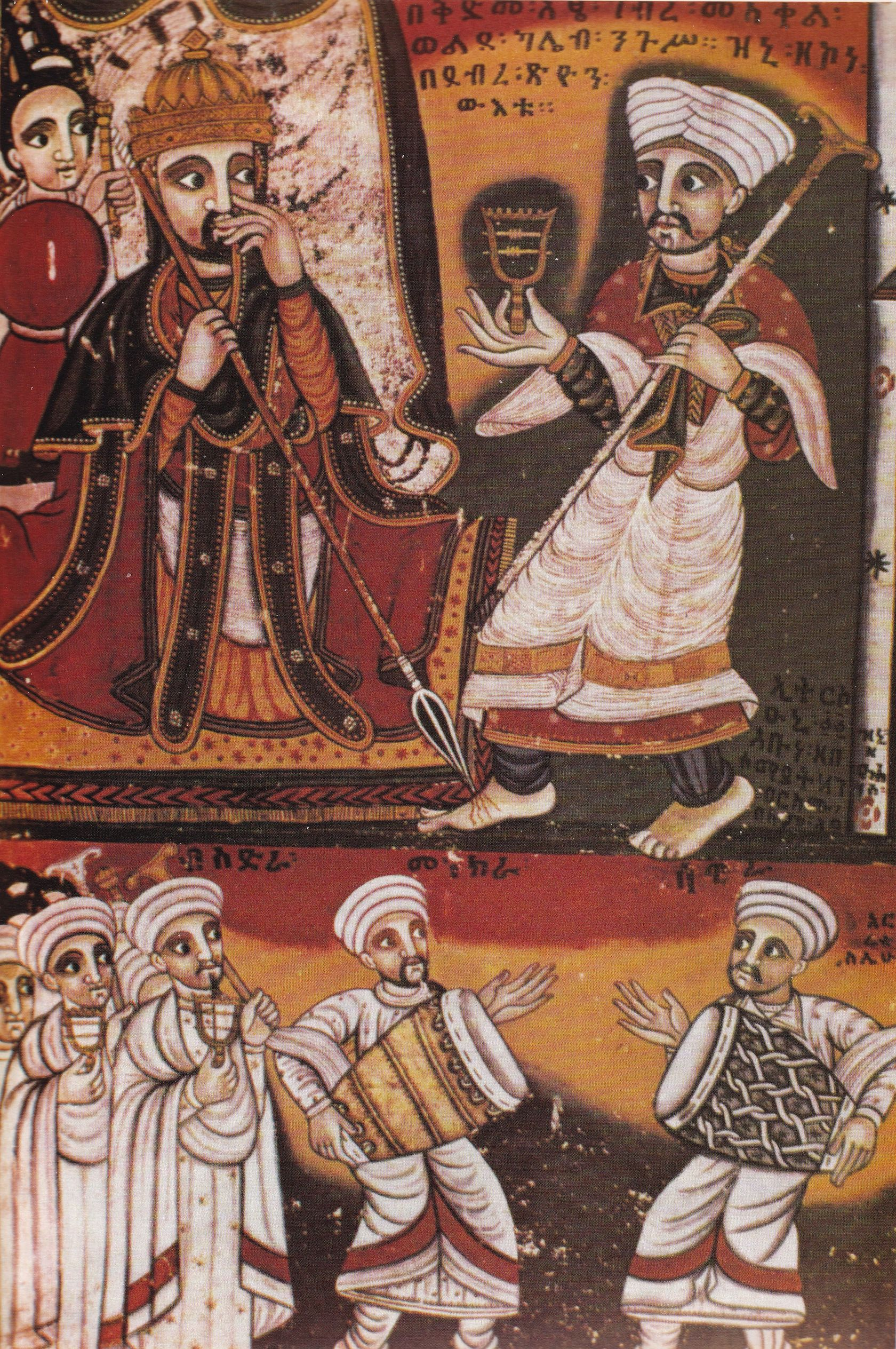

Composer
- Born: 25 April 505; Axum, Kingdom of Aksum
- Died: 20 May 571 (aged 66); Semien Mountains
- Venerated in: Ethiopian Orthodox Tewahedo Church; Eritrean Orthodox Tewahedo Church; Ethiopian Catholic Church; Eritrean Catholic Church
- Feast: 19 May
- Attributes: Old man wearing traditional attire and holding walking stick (mequamia), tsenatsel in front of Deggua book and three chants: Ge'ez, Ezel and Araray depicted as doves

Saint Yared (Ge'ez: ቅዱስ ያሬድ; 25 April 505 – 20 May 571) was an Aksumite composer, hymnwriter and scholar. He was credited with inventing the traditional music of Ethiopia, he developed the music of the Ethiopian Orthodox Church and Eritrean Orthodox Church. In a broader context, he helped establish liturgical music in the Coptic Orthodox Church and Syriac Orthodox Church, as well as create the Ethiopian musical notation system. Additionally, he composed Zema, or the chant tradition of Ethiopia, particularly the chants of the Ethiopian-Eritrean Orthodox Tewahedo Churches, which are still performed today.

According to the medieval chronicle The Gadla Yared (Acts of Yared), Yared was born in Axum. After the death of his father, his activity in education gradually declined which led him to be sent to parish priest Abba Gedeon. Yared then went to his uncle birthplace in Murade Qal. He saw a worm trying to climb tree with numerous attempts until the last moment. The worm struggle had inspire him and pursue to read and study Holy Scriptures. He became a priest at Church of Our Lady, Mary of Zion, then attracted to the Aksum king Gebre Meskel. He developed musical notation, including Zema or Ethiopian chant as well as authoring the famous Book of Deggua.

At the age of 66, Yared died in Semien Mountains during journey of tutoring.

He is regarded as a saint of the Ethiopian-Eritrean Orthodox Church, with his feast day celebrated on 19 May. His name is from the Biblical person known in English as "Jared" (Book of Genesis 5:15).

== Life ==
Much of Yared's life is broadly accounted in the medieval hagiography The Gadla Yared (Acts of Yared), whose composition was recovered in the 16th century. Yared was born on 25 April 505 in Axum from his father Abyud (Isaac) and his mother Christina (Tawklia).

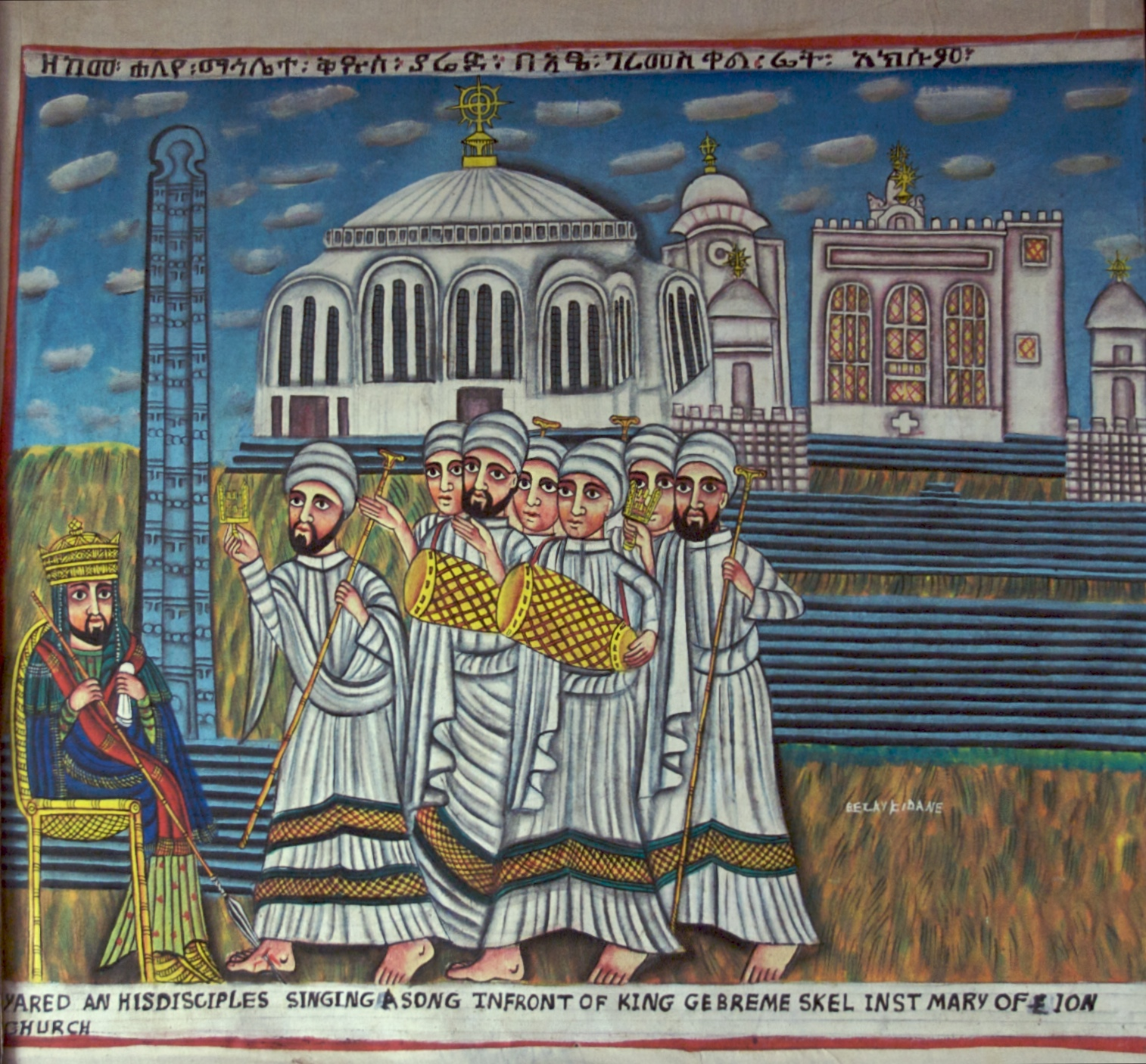
Yared with disciples singing to King Gebre Meskel

Yared was enticed by the Aksumite king Gebre Meskel, which led to his musical prominence, composing Zema, or chant. Following his musical success, he asked the king to live in ascetics, saying:

Promise to grant me...allow me to retire from my work in the court and to live among the people so that I may devote the rest of my life to teaching, to meditation and to prayer.

The king allowed his request and Yared travelled to Semien Mountains. He developed the Book of Deggua, (De'guaa) in Geʽez, which means "lamentations".

Yared also played pivotal role in church building. For instance, he consecrated churches in Debre Damo that were founded by Abuna Aregawi. Yared also taught students at Tana Qirqos in Lake Tana.

Yared also established churches in Gojjam, Begemder (today: Gondar), and Tigray. He went to Gayint and built a church called Saint Mariam at Zur Amba. The foundation is said to be as a result of "God's guide" and this location was named Zur Amba after "appearance of God to Aragawi". The account was written about God's appearance and guidance to Aragawi in Geʽez: "Zur Abba Mengale Misraq...." which means "...Abba, turn to the east; you will find the way to the hill."

== Later life and death ==
According to Ethiopian Orthodox tradition, Yared died on 11 Genbot (19 May), after spending his final years as a hermit. In the Gadla Yared, he was buried in the Semien Mountains.

19 May is his feast day in the Orthodox Tewahedo Church in commemoration of his death.

== In popular culture ==
Little known of the life of St. Yared outside the traditional account. St. Yared thought to gather his pupils to teach his musical system after asceticism in monastic life. He has been said to bequeath musical heir where the practice also revolutionised "a genealogy of masters from St. Yared in the 6th-century to Aleqa Mersha in the 20th-century". St. Yared's chant and voice are revered as powerful; his performance on liturgical music outstrips into secular domain, where "the remark [is] often made of a good singer; his voice makes one cry." His work has been contested to controversy by religious and secular discourse. Secular teaching argued that St. Yared is the base and father of secular music. The outlook of "secular music" is strongly objected to by the Orthodox Church. Other challenges are spiritual songs in audio and audiovisual form are possible without an original hymn. Without proper knowledge, some musicians prepare religious music and some singers take to secular form. The most contentious is the use of church treasures such as drum, sistrum, clothes and sticks currently used by Protestant followers. Some of St. Yared's songs like "Yekome Wereb", "Yetegulet Digua", "Yeankober Wereb", Yewashera Qine", Yeachabr Wereb", "Yeselelkula Kidase", "Ye Aba Giorgis" and "Ze Gasicha Seatat" are becoming obsolete or few scholars have no students.

=== Reception ===
St. Yared is regarded by Ethiopian Studies scholars as the founder of qene. His musical work swayed Yohannes of Gebla in Wollo and Tewanei of Deg Istifa in Gojjam, who improvised into complex forms. The work also contributed to service from time of day to day of the year, depending on valuable occasional feasts and religious seasons. Deggua's summary opening by:

Oh! Music!...

Ah! Music that I heard the angels' sing in Heaven

Uttering Holy! Holy! Lord!

The Heavens and the Earth are filled with

Your holy praise

Tradition holds that St. Yared ascended to Heaven supported by angels Seraph and Cherub, singing "Holy! Holy! Holy!", a paraphrase of Ancient of Days in Book of Daniel. In addition, it augmented supernatural entities bolstered him: three white angels, and three white birds singing with animals and beasts. His compositions also reflect agriculture and seasons. For example, for the rainy season (mid-June to mid-September) and for the harvest season (mid-September to mid-December):

Rainy season

Listen to the sound of the footsteps of the rain!

When the rains pour down, the poor rejoice.

Listen to the sound of the footsteps of the rain!

When the rains pour down, the hungry are satiated...

The clouds hear and obey His word;

And the streams brim with water.

And the furrows quench their thirst...

Harvest season

In its own time, the rainy season has passed.

Now is established the season of plenty.

Behold! The plants have blossomed and brought forth fruit...

== See also ==
- Ethiopian chant
