= Kebero =

Double-headed hand drum used in Ethiopia, Eritrea and Sudan

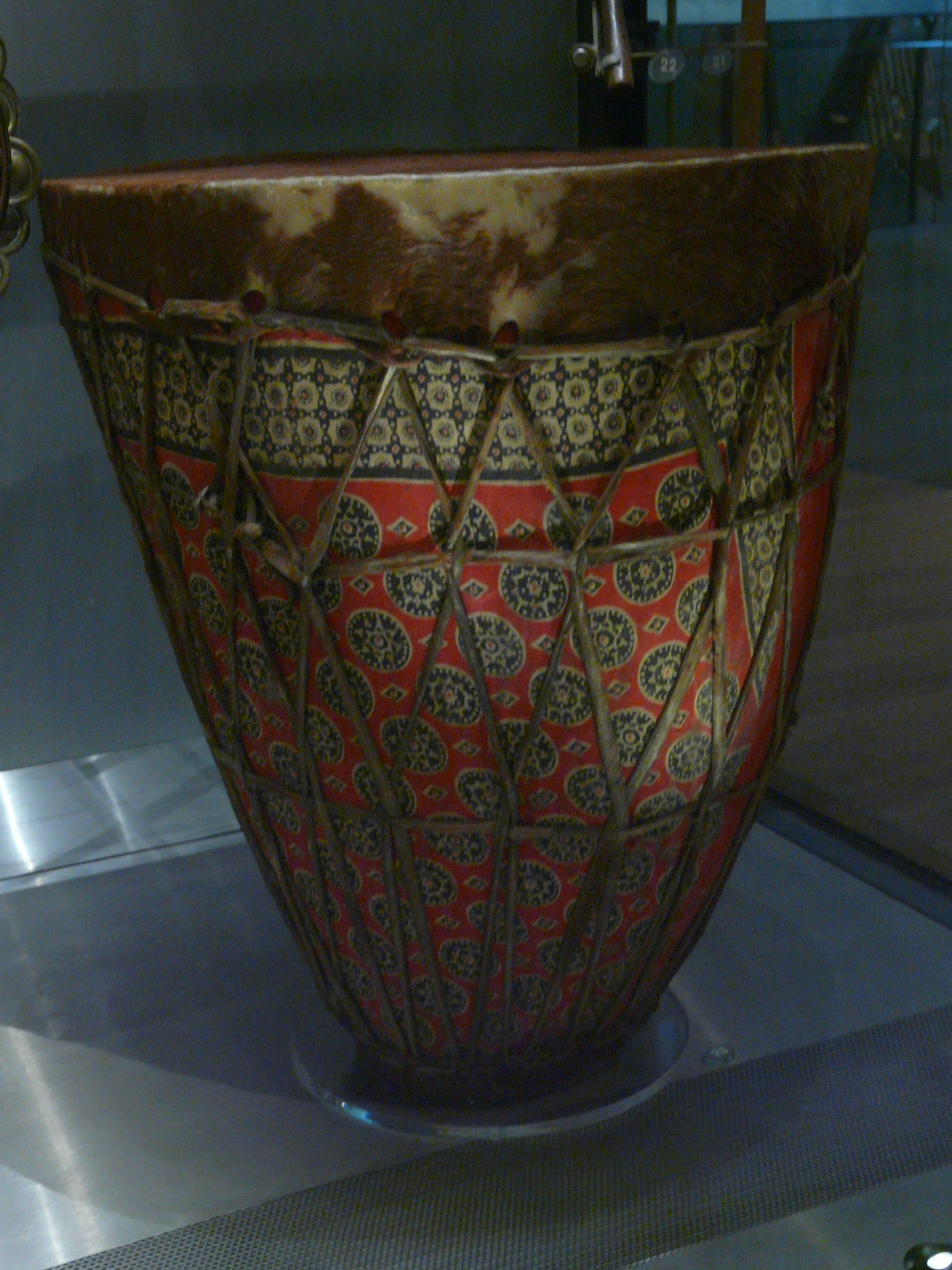
- A kebero drum in a conical shape, with ends firmed by animal hide

Percussion instrument
- Classification: Membranophone

Related instruments
- Hand drum

A kebero (Amharic and Tigrinya: ከበሮ) is a double-headed, conical hand drum used in the traditional music of Eritrea, Sudan and Ethiopia. A piece of animal hide is stretched over each end of the instrument, thus forming a membranophone. A large version of the kebero is also used in Ethiopian and Eritrean Orthodox Christian liturgical music, while smaller versions are used in secular celebrations. The kebero is primarily used in weddings, funerals and other ceremonies. The instrument is made from the hollowed out section of a tree trunk and then hard particles are inserted into it. The shell is then covered with two cow leather membranes, so that one can be tuned higher than the other. A kebero is also used in a worship called wereb. It is mostly done in Eritrea and Ethiopia.

== See also ==
- Music of Ethiopia
