= Architecture of Ethiopia =

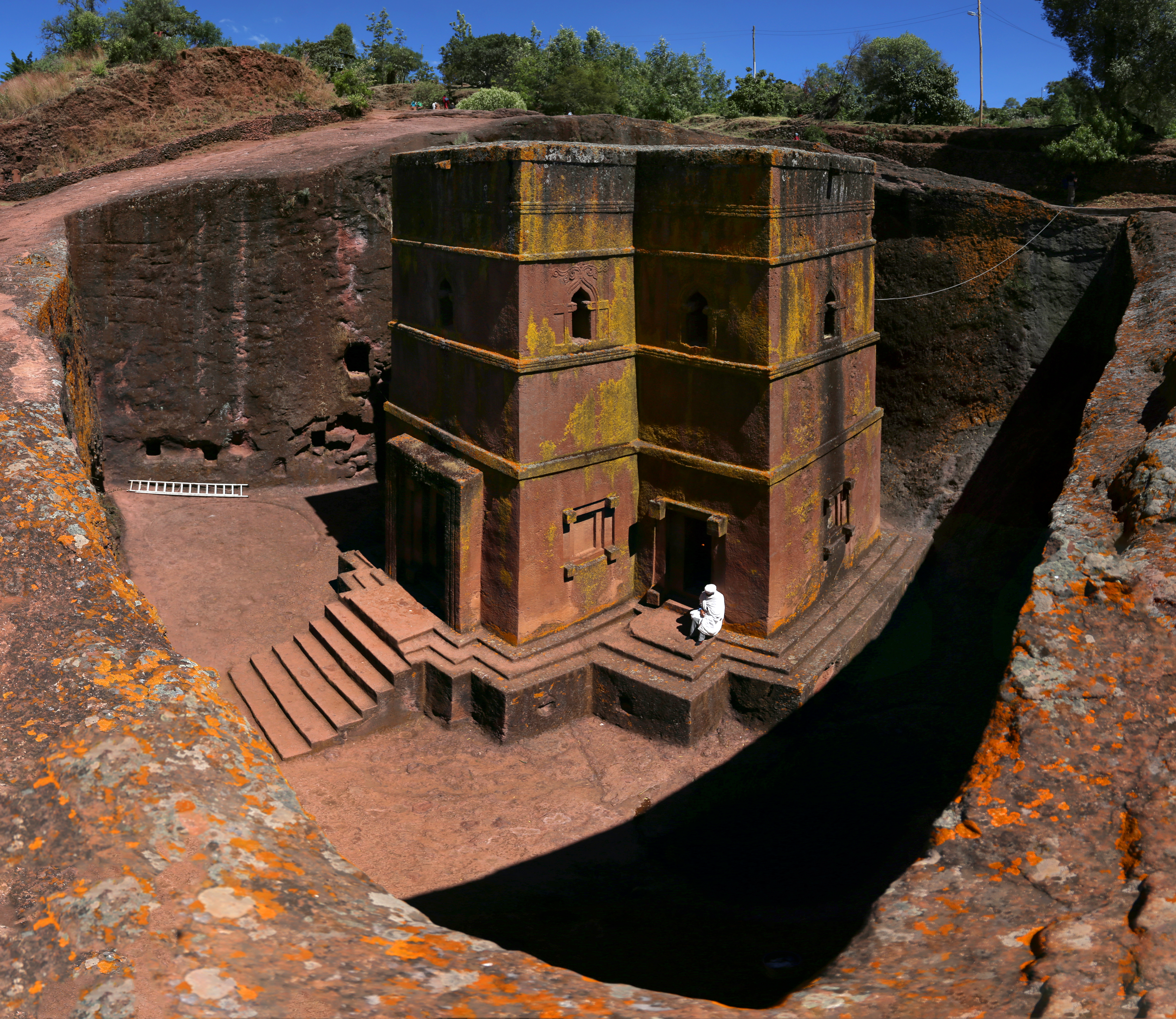
Church of Saint George, one of the many rock-cut churches in Lalibela, Ethiopia.

The architecture of Ethiopia varies greatly from region to region. Over the years, it has incorporated various architectural styles and techniques.

== Dʿmt (c. 800-400 BC) ==
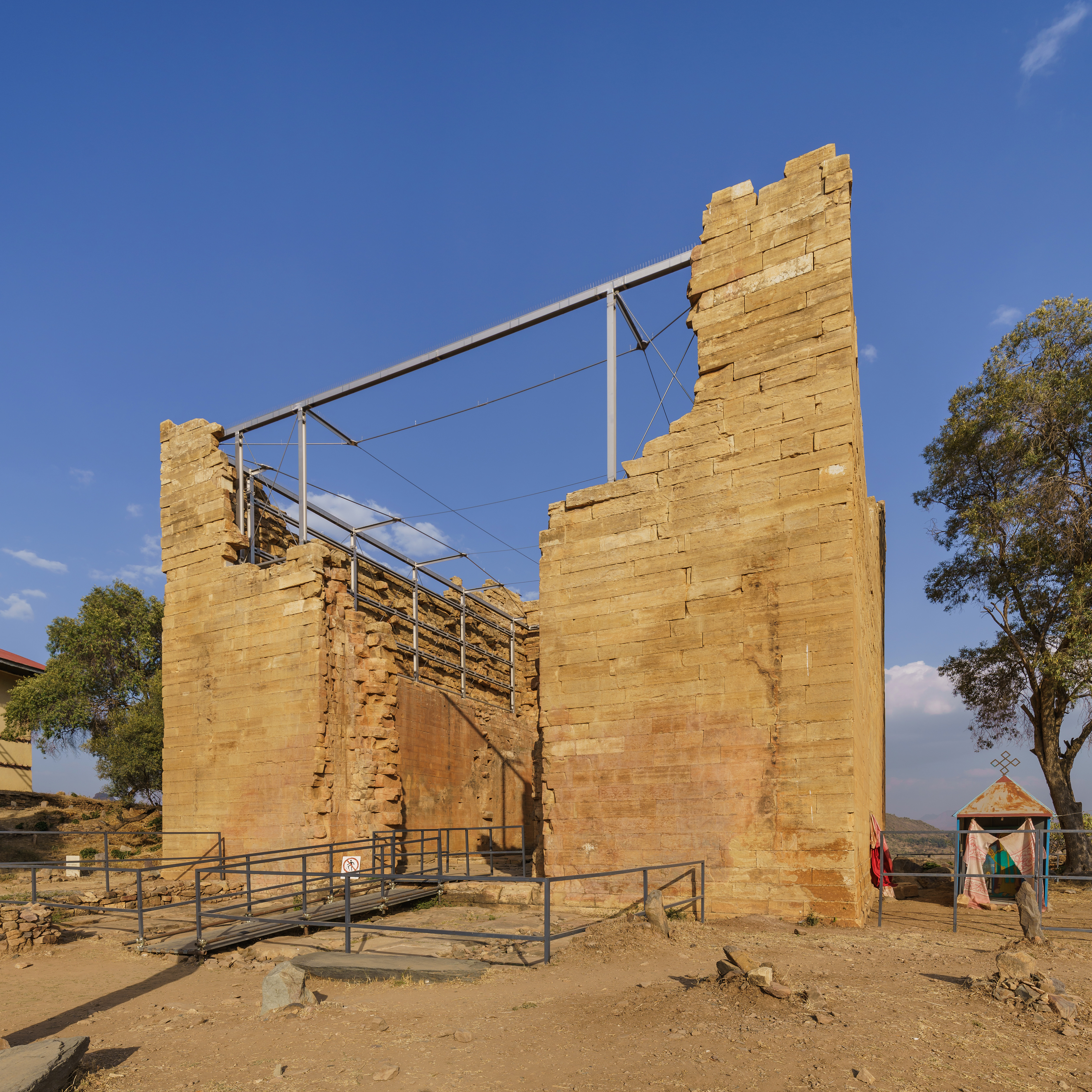
The ruin of the temple at Yeha, Tigray Region, Ethiopia.

The best known building of the period in the region is the ruined 8th-century BC multi-story tower at Yeha in Ethiopia, believed to have been the capital of Dʿmt. The Temple was built by Sabaeans from modern-day Yemen during the Sabean colonization of Africa and was dedicated to the Sabean Lunar deity Almaqah. Sabaean texts from Yeha mention a certain Lhy, of the Grb clan, of the family of Ygdm'I Fqmm of Marib consecrating his worldly goods and his son Hyrmh to ʿAṯtar and Almaqah.

== Aksumite architecture ==
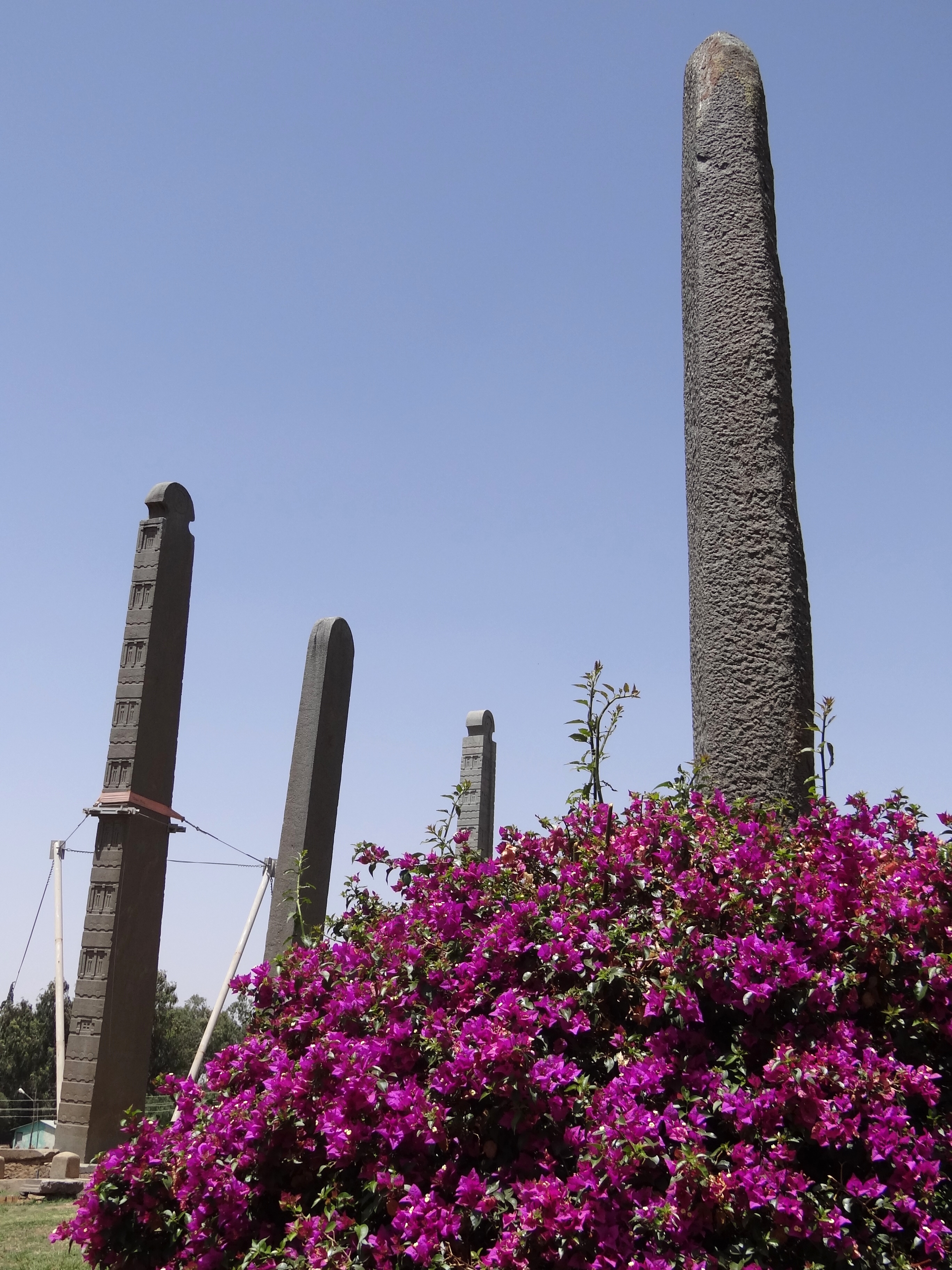
Stelae monuments in Northern Stelae Park, Axum.

Aksumite architecture flourished in the region from the 4th century BC onward. It persisted even after the transition from the Aksumite dynasty to the Zagwe dynasty in the 12th century, as attested by the numerous Aksumite influences in and around the medieval churches of Lalibela. Stelae (hawilts) and later entire churches were carved out of single blocks of rock. This was later emulated at Lalibela and throughout the Tigray Province, especially during the early-mid medieval period (c. 10th and 11th centuries in Tigray, mainly 12th century around Lalibela). Other monumental structures include massive underground tombs, often located beneath stelae. Among the most spectacular survivals are the giant stelae, one of which, now fallen (scholars think that it may have fallen during or immediately after erection), is the single largest monolithic structure ever erected (or attempted to be erected). Other well-known structures employing the use of monoliths include tombs such as the "Tomb of the False Door" and the tombs of Kaleb and Gebre Mesqel in Axum.

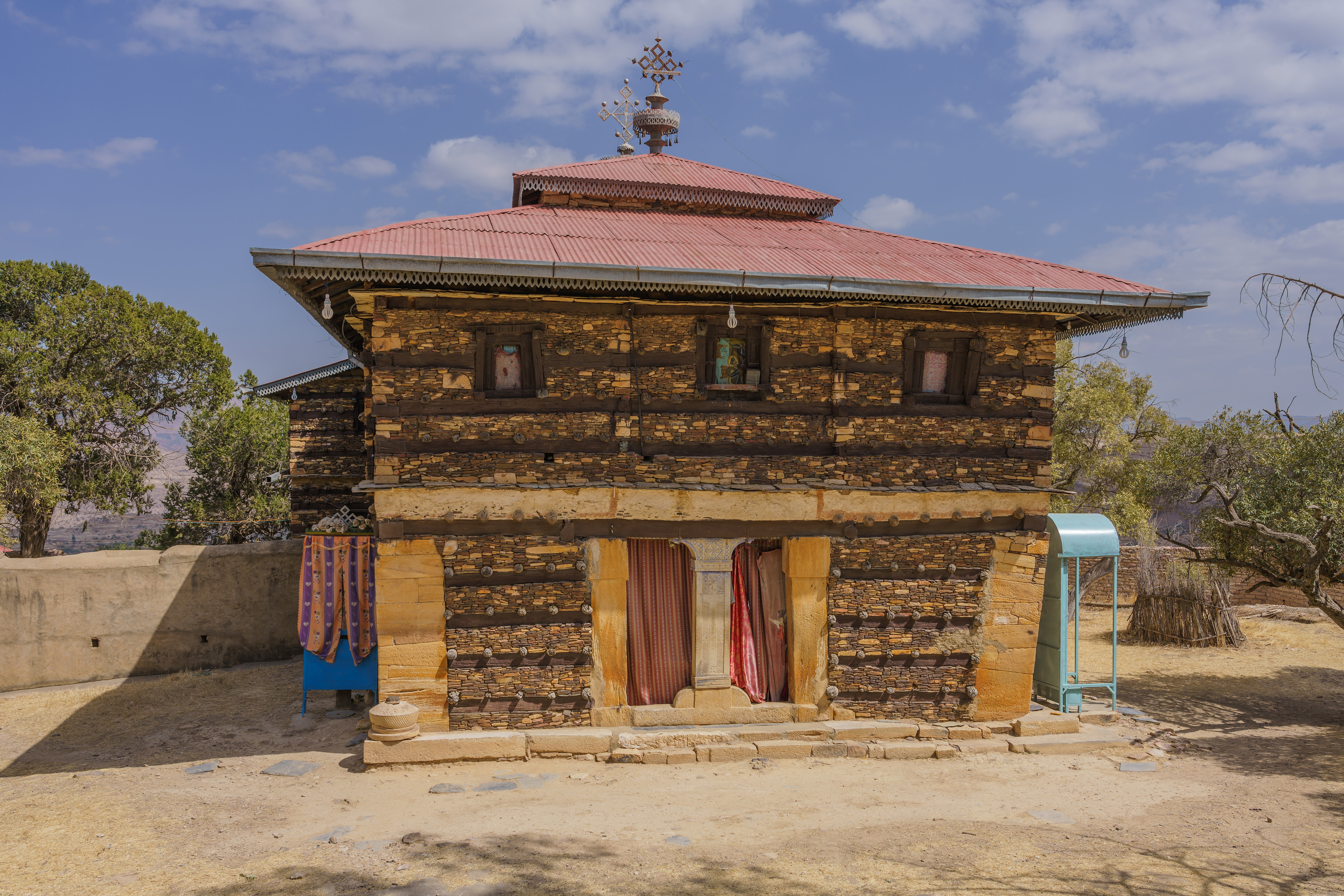
Church of Abuna Aregawi at the Debre Damo monastery, constructed around the mid-6th century.

Most structures, however, like palaces, villas, commoner's houses, and other churches and monasteries, were built of alternating layers of stone and wood. The protruding wooden support beams in these structures have been named "monkey heads" and are a staple of Aksumite architecture and a mark of Aksumite influence in later structures. Some examples of this style had whitewashed exteriors and/or interiors, such as the medieval 12th-century monastery of Yemrehanna Krestos near Lalibela, built during the Zagwe dynasty in Aksumite style. Contemporary houses were one-room stone structures, or two-storey square houses, or roundhouses of sandstone with basalt foundations. Villas were generally two to four storeys tall and built on sprawling rectangular plans (cf. Dungur ruins). A good example of still-standing Aksumite architecture is the monastery of Debre Damo from the 6th century.

== Zagwe dynasty ==
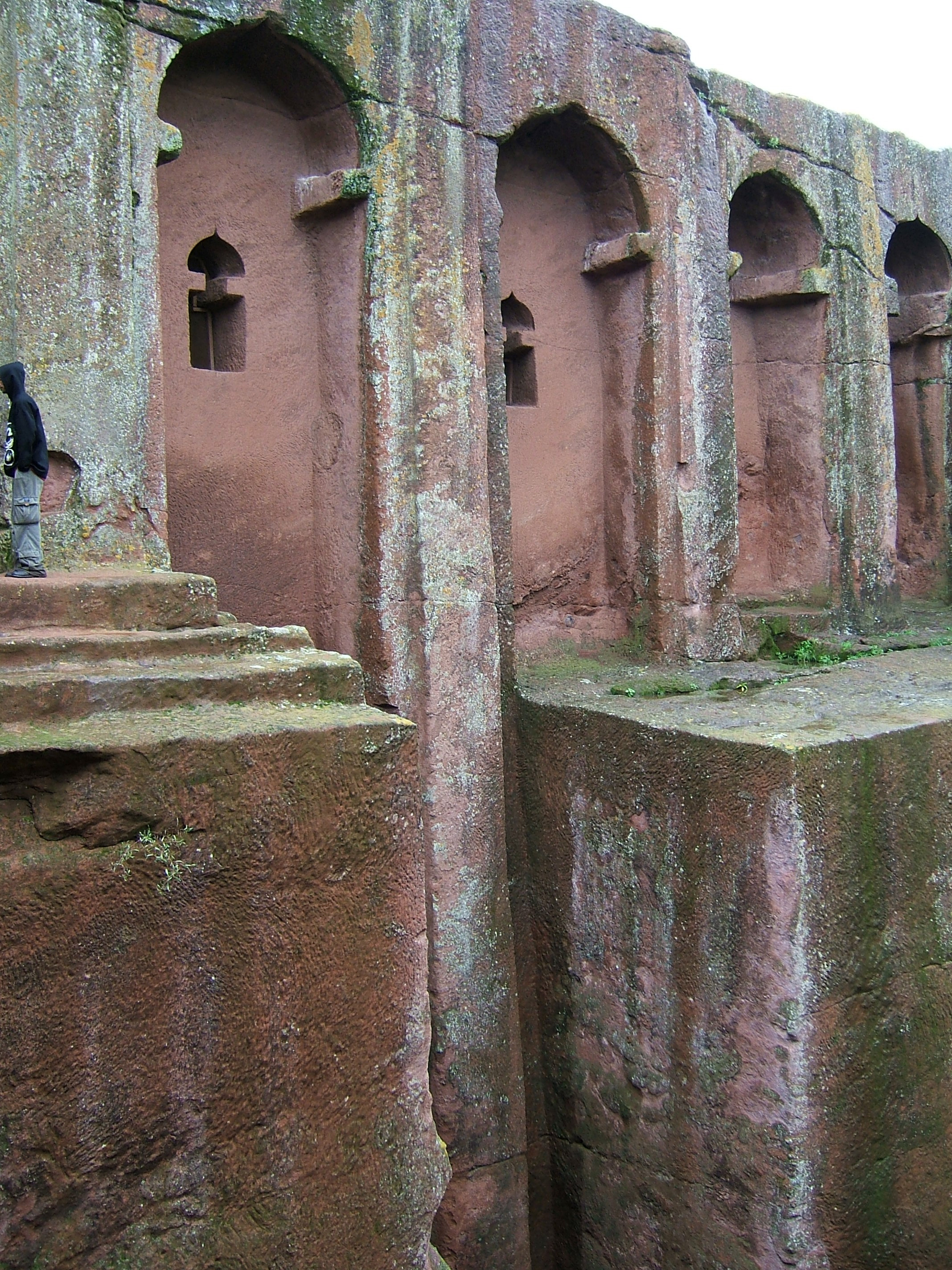
Lalibela's monolithic church Bete Gebriel-Rufa'el.

Ethiopian architecture continued to expand from the Aksumite style, but also incorporating new traditions with the expansion of the Ethiopian state. Styles incorporated more wood and rounder structures in commoner's architecture in the center of the country and the south, and these stylistic influencies were manifested in the slow construction of churches and monasteries. Throughout the medieval period, Aksumite architecture and influences and its monolithic tradition persisted, with its influence strongest in the early medieval (Late Aksumite) and Zagwe periods (when the churches of Lalibela were carved).

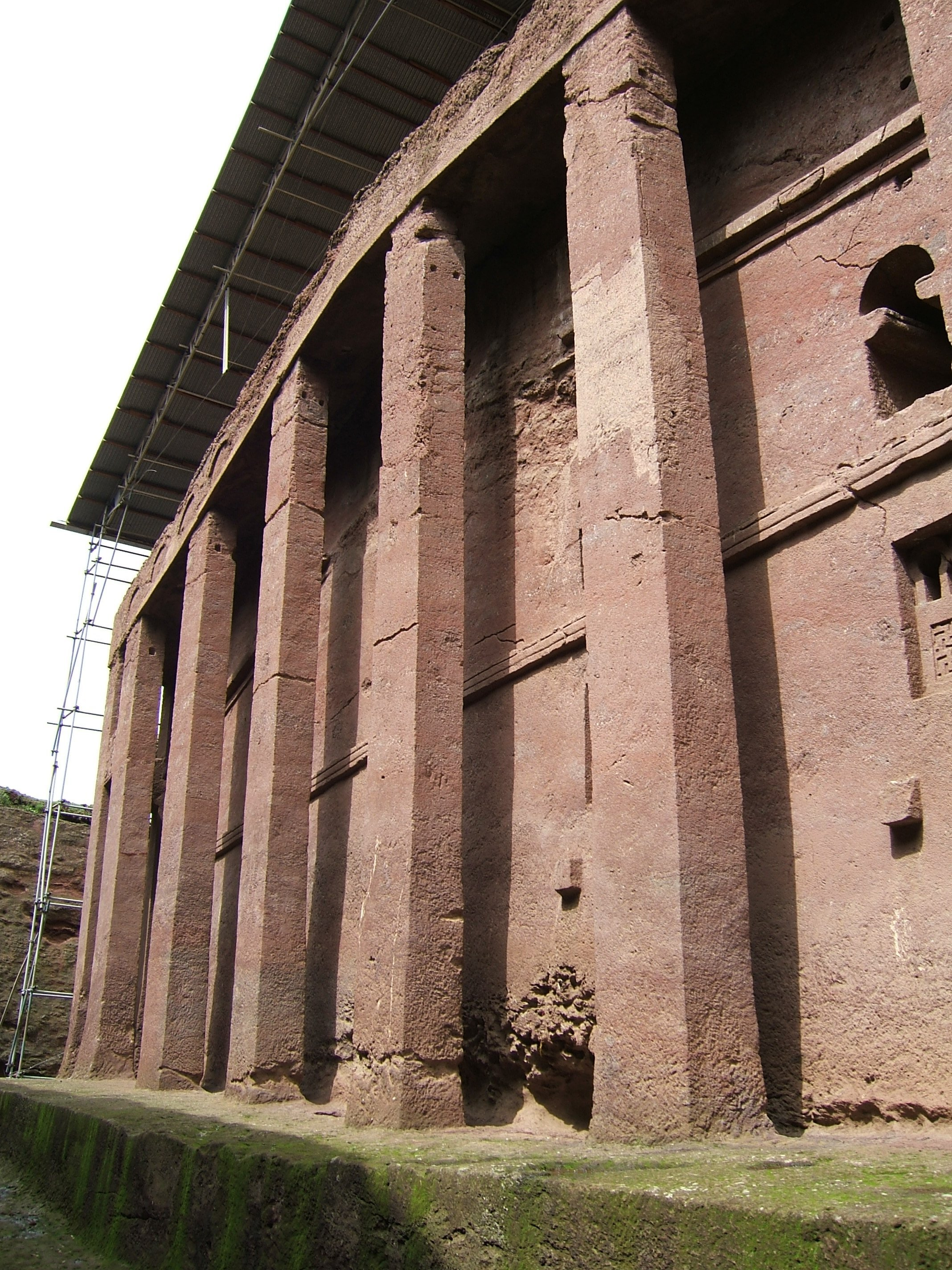
Biete Medhane Alem in Lalibela, the largest monolithic church in the world.

Throughout the medieval period, and especially from the 10th to 12th centuries, churches were hewn out of rock throughout Ethiopia, especially during the northernmost region of Tigray, which was the heart of the Aksumite Empire. However, rock-hewn churches have been found as far south as Adadi Mariam (15th century), about 100 km south of Addis Ababa.

The most famous example of Ethiopian rock-hewn architecture are the 11 monolithic churches of Lalibela, carved out of the red volcanic tuff found around the town. They are part of the UNESCO World Heritage Site at Lalibela. Though later medieval hagiographies attribute all 11 structures to the eponymous King Lalibela (the town was called Roha and Adefa before his reign), new evidence indicates that they may have been built separately over a period of a few centuries, with only a few of the more recent churches having been built under his reign. Archaeologist and Ethiopisant David Phillipson postulates, for instance, that Bete Gebriel-Rufa'el was actually built in the very early medieval period, some time between 600 and 800 A.D., originally as a fortress but was later turned into a church.

== Gondarine architecture ==
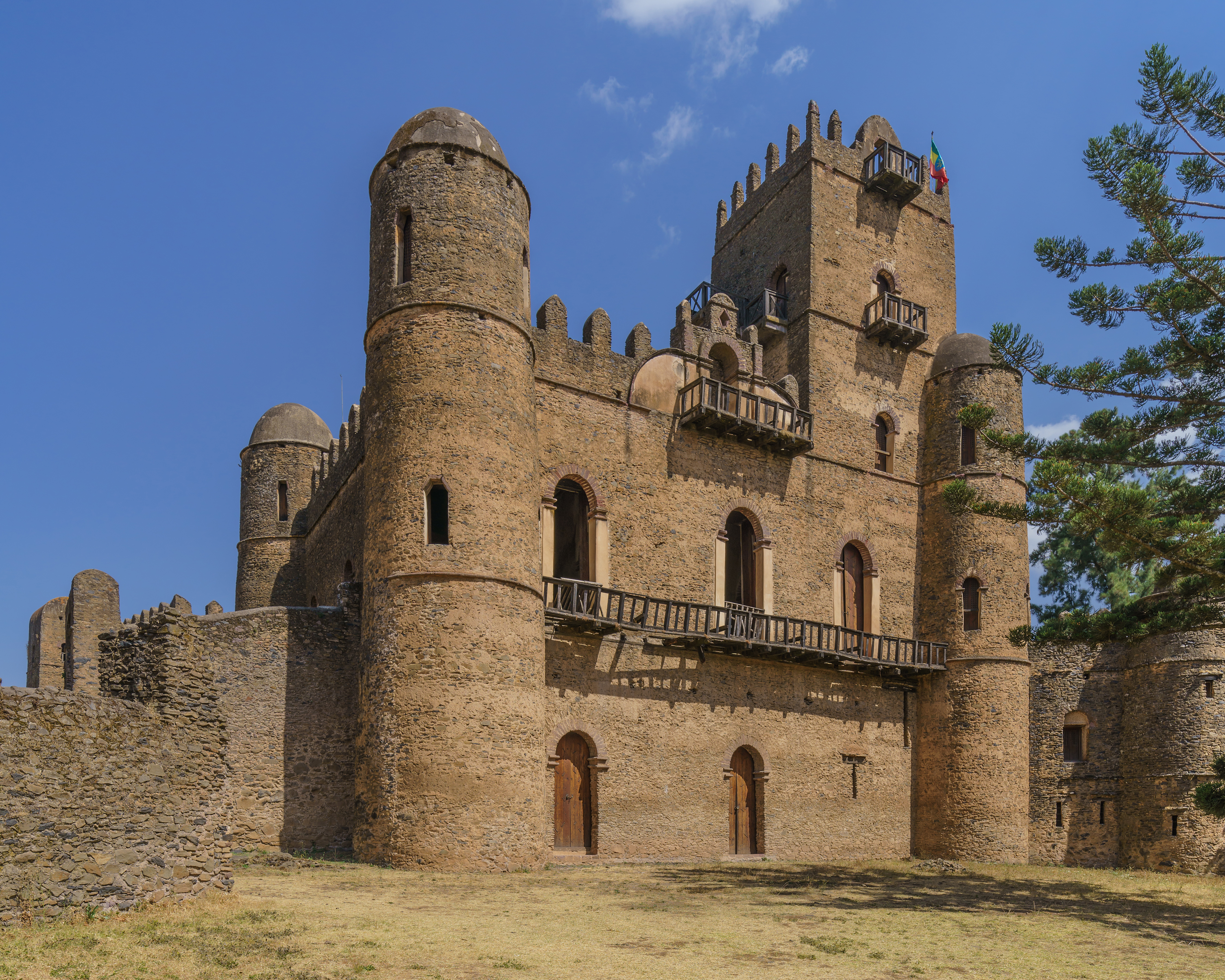
Fasilides' castle in Fasil Ghebbi, Gondar.

During the early modern period, the absorption of new diverse influences such as Baroque, Arab, Turkish and Gujarati Indian style began with the arrival of Portuguese Jesuit missionaries in the 16th and 17th centuries. Portuguese soldiers had initially come in the mid-16th century as allies to aid Ethiopia in its fight against Adal, and later Jesuits came hoping to convert the country. Some Turkish influence may have entered the country during the late 16th century during its war with the Ottoman Empire (see Habesh), which resulted in an increased building of fortresses and castles.

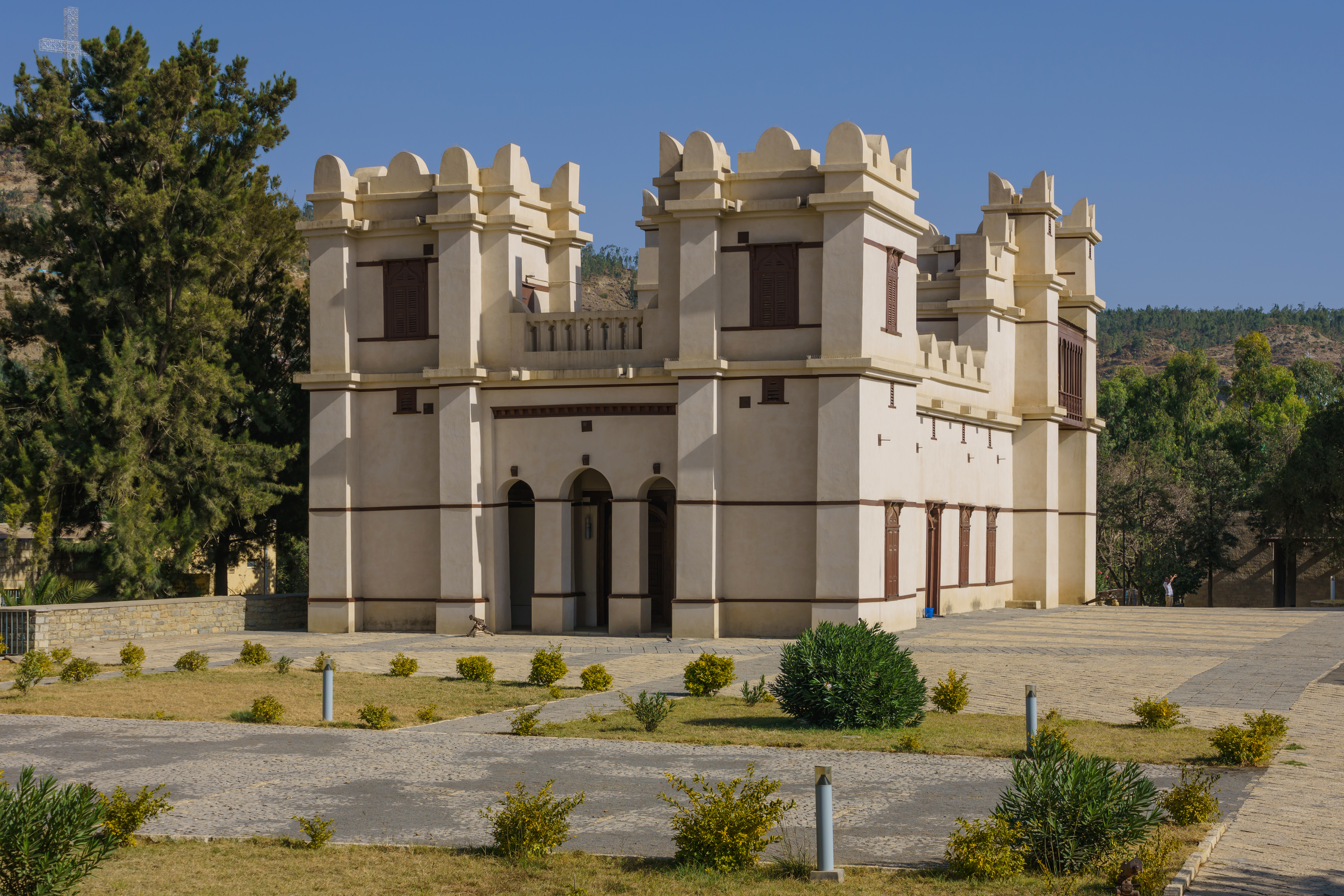
Atse Yohannes IV castle (museum) in Mekelle

Ethiopia, naturally easily defensible because of its numerous ambas or flat-topped mountains and rugged terrain, yielded little tactical use from the structures in contrast to their advantages in the flat terrain of Europe and other areas, and so had until this point little developed the tradition. Castles were built especially beginning with the reign of Sarsa Dengel around the Lake Tana region, and subsequent Emperors maintained the tradition, eventually resulting in the creation of the Fasil Ghebbi (royal enclosure of castles) in the newly founded capital (1636), Gondar. Emperor Susenyos (r.1606-1632) converted to Catholicism in 1622 and attempted to make it the state religion, declaring it as such from 1624 until his abdication; during this time, he employed Arab, Gujarati (brought by the Jesuits), and Jesuit masons and their styles, as well as local masons, some of whom were Beta Israel. With the reign of his son Fasilides, most of these foreigners were expelled, although some of their architectural styles were absorbed into the prevailing Ethiopian architectural style. This style of the Gondarine dynasty would persist throughout the 17th and 18th centuries especially and also influenced modern 19th-century and later styles.

However Gondarine architecture was limited exclusive to royalty. Hassan ibn Ahmed Al Haymi, Yemeni Ambassador to Ethiopia in 1684, mentions that besides the Fasil Ghebbi the rest of Gondar was made tukuls, or huts which he describes as “nets of grass”. James Bruce states that mortar was only used in Gondar, and even there its quality was very bad.

== See also ==
- Architecture of Africa
- Rock-cut architecture
- List of colossal sculpture in situ
