= Sabaeans in the Horn of Africa =

1st millennium BC process

Altar RIÉth 53 from the Archaeological Museum in Asmara, Eritrea. It shows a typical South Arabian structure and decoration.

The origins of dʿmt (enunciated as "Da'amat" or "Di'amat") and the role of the Sabaeans of Sheba in ancient South Arabia have long been debated by historians.

== Background ==
dʿmt (enunciated as "Da'amat" or "Di'amat") was a polity centred on Yeha in the Tigray Region of Ethiopia near the border with Eritrea, founded some time around 800 BCE, and is considered to have been the first state in the region. It was the precursor to the Kingdom of Aksum and the later Ethiopian Empire. The nature of its origins regarding the role played by Sabaeans from Sheba in South Arabia continues to be debated by historians.

== Development of social complexity ==
Archaeological research has suggested two distinct trajectories to social complexity in the northern Horn of Africa.

=== Eritrean-Sudanese lowlands ===
An early culture in the Eritrean-Sudanese lowlands was the Atbai tradition, dating to the 5th millennium BCE, which likely originated in the northern Mereb (Gash) delta. The Butana Group, Gash Group, and Jebel Mokram Group appear to delineate the rise and decline of social complexity between the Atbarah River and Mereb Delta. Egyptian trade with the elusive Land of Punt likely stimulated development. Seasonal movements of the pastoral Gash Group and agropastoral Jebel Mokram Group to the Eritrean-Ethiopian highlands were a significant part of the regional network.

==== Butana Group ====
The Butana Group was located on the east side of the Atbara River, straddling the far-east of the Butana region and the southern Itbay, and dates to around 3800-3000 BCE. Evidence for social complexity is limited to the discovery of porphyry mace-heads, known to have been associated with wealthy burials in contemporary prehistoric Egypt and Nubia. This indicates that some individuals may have had more prestige and authority than others, as porphyry was likely imported 300 kilometres (190 mi) northeast. It is thought to have had three levels of social hierarchy.

==== Gash Group ====
The Gash Group was located around Kassala on the border between Sudan and Eritrea, with its leading site being Mahal Teglinos. It dates from around 3000-1500 BCE, and was contemporaneous with the Kerma culture in Nubia. It served as a crossroad for trade between Kerma, the Red Sea, and the Ethiopian Highlands, with the ancient Egyptian conquest of Kerma around 1550 BCE breaking this practice. Groups of people with Middle Nubian ceramics then settled the region. There is a lot of evidence for social complexity, including settlement patterns, burials (such as funerary steles), administrative devices, architecture, and standardization of pottery. It became progressively more socially stratified throughout its period, and may have constituted a chiefdom, although no definitive evidence has been uncovered. It is thought to have had five levels of social hierarchy.

==== Jebel Mokram Group ====
The Jebel Mokram Group was also located near Kassala, with its primary site of Jebel Abu Gamal to the south, and dates to around 1500-800 BCE. The only evidence for social complexity is its settlement pattern. It is thought to have had four levels of social hierarchy. The Jebel Mokram Group was succeeded by the Hagiz Group for which there is no evidence of social complexity, and it appears to have adopted a nomadic lifestyle.

=== Eritrean-Ethiopian highlands ===
Comparatively little research has been conducted in the Eritrean-Ethiopian highlands, with the earliest groups identified dating to the 3rd and 2nd millennium BCE near Mekelle, Ethiopia. From the late 2nd or early 1st millennium BCE groups with different ceramic traditions have been identified in the Hamasien highlands (north-central Eritrea), Akkele Guzay (south-central Eritrea), Agame (eastern Tigray), and central Tigray. The highlands were included in the South Arabian area of trade in the early 1st millennium BCE.

==== Mezber ====
Mezber is an archaeological site in eastern Tigray that was inhabited from 1600 BCE to the 1st century CE. A large amount of animal bones indicates that the group there was likely cattle-focused agropastoralists between 1600-900 BCE. A 2023 paper authored by 17 scholars said that the seasonal movement of Gash Groups (specifically one from Agordat) may have played an essential role in the origin of agropastoralism and early social complexity in the highlands. A large building, possibly an elite residence, lacks Sabaean influence and dates to between 800-750 BCE.

==== Ancient Ona ====
The ancient Ona culture was located in Hamasien, and dated from at least 900-400 BCE, although it is thought to have originated in the 2nd millennium BCE. Its largest site is Sembel. It served as an intermediary for trade between the Gash Group and the Red Sea. Evidence for social complexity includes the settlement pattern, administrative devices, and a rich grave dating to the mid-1st millennium BCE.

== Evidence of South Arabian influence ==
The northern Horn of Africa underwent a period of South Arabian influence, approximately between 700-400 BCE.

=== Architecture ===
==== Yeha ====
The most notable evidence for Sabaean influence on architecture is the Great Temple of Yeha, a resolutely Sabaean-style temple dated to the 7th/8th century BCE and the tallest (14m/46ft) of any preserved. The limestone ashlars show typical Sabaean stonemasonry, and the temple's exterior wall resembles the Almaqah temple in Sirwah and the Temple of Awwam in Yemen's Marib Governorate. The interior layout is similar to that of the Bar'an Temple in Marib and the temple in Sirwah. There was likely a building previously there before construction, and some have questioned whether it was ever completed.

Grat Be'al Gebri is another monument in Yeha, however it has been poorly preserved. It is somewhat similar to the Great Temple and the five-pillared building in Sirwah; however, it requires further excavation. There are also remains of a third temple with fragments of South Arabian inscriptions.

==== Hawelti ====
In Hawelti of pillars have been uncovered, likely to have been individual monuments and stelae due to their differing measurements and styles (there are similar monuments at Kaskase, Eritrea). The stonemasonry, rectangular shape, and Sabaean inscriptions show South Arabian influences, whereas the method of raising and their function appears to be indigenous.

==== Other Almaqah temples ====
Another Almaqah temple is the Temple of Meqaber Gaʿewa, located 6 km south of Wukro, Ethiopia. While similar to the others in its layout, it doesn't have the same detailed stonemasonry as seen at Yeha and in South Arabia, which is more akin to indigenous architecture of the region. There is another building thought to have been a temple found in Gobochela.

=== Epigraphs ===
There are various royal inscriptions in Ancient South Arabian script in Sabaic that mention dʿmt, the title mlk (king), and mkrb, most often interpreted as the Sabaic title mukarrib (or possibly the honorific makrūb meaning "blessed". There is also the unknown mlkn ṣrʿn). There are seven inscriptions that mention dʿmt, all found in Aksum or the eastern Tigray Region (none at Yeha or in Eritrea). It is unclear whether they had been moved from their original locations. There are inscriptions naming non-dʿmt rulers at Seglamen, Keskese, and Yeha.

Two inscriptions mention sbʿ, considered to refer to a geographical region or tribe/polity, Sheba, or a personal name. Some inscriptions on votive altars near Yeha also mention individuals from Sheba. Inscriptions also mention the Sabaean deities Almaqah and ʿAṯtar as well as indigenous ones. Of the 11 deities mentioned, 5 are South Arabian. One inscription is from a Sabaean stonemason from Marib, and another on an altar indicates the Great Temple of Yeha was dedicated to Almaqah. Some inscriptions divide the population into "reds" and "blacks", possibly referring to skin colour. Inscriptions in Sabaean are fragmentary and total 40 words, most of which are names. From a palaeographic perspective, they appear not to have been the earliest ones. Other inscriptions that could be linguistically analysed are Ethio-Semitic, which are more numerous and have been labelled proto-Geʽez.

=== Art ===
There are four statues at Hawelti, Maqaber Gaewa, and Addi Galamo, and a throne at Hawelti (the latter of which is South Arabian in style). The artistic style appears to be syncretic, with Achamaenian, Meriotic, Greek, and South Arabian influences. Some votive altars are Sabaean in style, namely those that are cylindrical and cubic.

=== Material culture ===
A necropolis uncovered in Yeha, dating to around the 6th/7th century BCE, provides evidence of both Sabaean and indigenous grave goods. They include bronze seals, some of which depict the Sabaean ibex (associated with Almaqah), but these objects have no parallel in Sabaean society. Similar graves, marked by stelae, are found at Bet Giyorgis in Aksum. The tombs are rock-cut, a practice which likely predated the founding of dʿmt.

Surveys at Yeha and Hawulti-Melazo reveal pottery and terracotta figurines of undoubted local origin; however, some figurines of women show Sabaean influence. Various peasant settlements dating from the first millennium BCE, such as those of the Ancient Ona culture located west and south of Asmara (eg. Sembel) or Kidane Mehret located northeast of Aksum, show no sign of South Arabian influence.

=== Linguistics ===
The origins of Semitic languages continue to be debated, however Akkadian receives the most support. Others consider Semitic languages to have originated in Africa, and to have been spoken in Egypt as early as 3000 BCE.

In 2009, Andrew Kitchen, Christopher Ehret, Shiferaw Assefa, and Connie Mulligan authored a paper which discussed the origins of the Ethio-Semitic languages. They analysed vocabularies using Bayesian computational phylogenetics to model language evolution and test hypotheses of Semitic history, concluding a non-African origin introduced to the Horn of Africa between 1800 BCE and the Common Era, with a mean of 850 BCE, indicating that it can be associated with development of indigenous complex societies, coinciding with a period of South Arabian influence.

However, this conclusion is disputed, and David Phillipson wrote in 2012 that there is linguistic evidence that Semitic languages were spoken in the northern Horn much earlier, and that a date between 1000-750 BCE can no longer be accepted.

=== Genetics ===
In 2014 a paper authored by 8 scholars said that the mean-time for the introduction of west Eurasian ancestry into East Africa is thought to be around 1000 BCE, coinciding with dʿmt and a period of South Arabian influence, and notes that the highest levels of west Eurasian ancestry are today found around the area dʿmt was located in (Tigray Region and Amhara Region). In 2018 a paper by Carina Schlebusch and Mattias Jakobsson notes that the founding of dʿmt, which they said was established by Sabaeans, is a good candidate for the initial admixture of Eurasian genes into East Africa.

In 2016 a paper authored by 19 scholars focussing on haplogroup R0a found that their results were inconsistent with a large migration from Arabia into the Horn of Africa around the time of dʿmt, however said there may have been some minor gene flow owing to growth in trade between the two regions at this time.

== Theories ==
The colonisation theory, in which dʿmt is considered to have been a colony of Sheba, was first articulated by Carlo Conti Rossini based on the Hamitic hypothesis in the early 20th century, and was widely accepted by historians and entered popular historical understanding. However from the 1970s onwards, epigraphic, linguistic, and more recently archaeological evidence and re-interpretation indicated that developments previously attributed to South Arabian contact were indigenous in origin and had occurred at an earlier date, causing the colonisation theory to fall out of favour with Ethiopianists by the 1980s. Scholars of South Arabian archaeology and epigraphy tend to favour a migration or colonisation, while scholars of African archaeology tend to stress an indigenous origin. Ethiopian traditional sources also gesture to an indigenous origin, however link the state to Queen of Sheba/Makeda and King Solomon.

Several scholars have lamented the lack of evidence to work with. Fabianne Dugast and Iwona Gajda have consequently suggested that dʿmt might not have been the only state in the region in the first millennium BCE. David Phillipson writes that other polities, indicated by inscriptions mentioning non-dʿmt rulers, were likely short-lived and localised. Some have questioned whether dʿmt was the name of a state, a tribe, a region, or a specific location. Rodolfo Fattovich has argued that dʿmt is overemphasised by scholars, and that it was likely "an episode in a long-term process of social, economic and political transformations, which were stimulated by the progressive inclusion of the northern Horn of Africa into a macro-scale network of interaction between the Mediterranean and Indian Ocean". A 2023 paper authored by 17 scholars said that South Arabians, while impactful, appear not "to have been direct drivers of economic or cultural developments in Tigray and central Eritrea".

Archaeological research has been carried out by both the Ethiopian Institute of Archaeology and the Sanaa Branch of the DAI. As of 2012, over 100 sites had been attributed to the Yeha-Matara ceramic tradition associated with Dʿmt, however only 12 had been investigated. In 2019, Sabaean inscriptions were found in Somaliland and Puntland, as well as a Sabaean temple whose inscriptions say its construction was ordered by the admiral of Sheba's fleet. In 2025 Alfredo González-Ruibal said "we can perhaps discern two different models: a proper colonialist one along the northern Somali seaboard, with direct intervention of the state and aimed at the extraction of resources, and a diasporic model in the northern Horn, led by élites who soon mixed with local people, while maintaining ties with their ancestral homeland". He notes that differences between the nomadic pastoralist groups in Somalia and South Arabians were probably too great for assimilation.

=== Small-scale migration and assimilation ===
In 2017, Rodolfo Fattovich wrote that while the epigraphic and architectural evidence suggests that migration or colonisation was the primary factor for state formation in the region, which has been contradicted by archaeological evidence which indicates use of Sabaean symbols was restricted to the elite, and that the local population were indigenous and maintained their local traditions. The role played by the few Sabaean individuals recorded in inscriptions in the formation of dʿmt is unknown, however they likely served to introduce Sabaean culture to the region. He says the Sabaean titles indicate the state was built on the Sabaean model, however the mention of queens in inscriptions indicate that they played a dynastic role more congruent to a local political tradition. He concludes that the present evidence suggests Sabaean influence was superficial, and that dʿmt arose from two indigenous cultures converging (one in Ethiopia's Tigray Region and one in Eritrea). In 2010 Fattovich said that the distinction between the elite, who used Sabaean symbols of power, and commoners, who maintained their local traditions, indicates that indigenous rulers used elements of foreign origin to express their royal rank, while Matthew Curtis posited that it was to portray prestige and legitimise claims to rulership.

In 2012, David Phillipson wrote that sites showing South Arabian affinity had received disproportionate attention from archaeologists, and numbered small in comparison to the overall settlement of the region. He says that especially at Yeha, South Arabian influence was strong enough to eliminate doubt that some South Arabian individuals were at least present and contributed to some settlements' development, however they were likely small in number and assimilated quickly. He finds the notion that they established political dominance in any place "extremely doubtful". He also considers a single unitary kingdom called dʿmt to have been very unlikely.

In 2025 Alfredo González-Ruibal said that "epigraphic and archaeological evidence are difficult to reconcile with a Sabaean colonisation", and that the "idea of colonisation as such has been discarded". He notes that no South Arabian king is mentioned in the inscriptions, nor any mention of a migration to Ethiopia in South Arabia, however states that South Arabian individuals were "undoubtedly present" and that they likely "contributed decisively to the development of specific centres". González-Ruibal says that the reference to sb likely means a local ruler claimed sovereignty over both dʿmt and Sheba. He says that a few elements are identical to Sabaean ones, and that others appear to be appropriations. González-Ruibal concludes that they were small South Arabian diasporas who lived in enclaves that quickly assimilated into the local population.

Also in 2025, Willeke Wendrich wrote "Around 800 BCE [native inhabitants] appear to have organized themselves into a complex society with polities arising around a number of regional centers, including Kaskase, Matara, Mazbar, Seglamen, Wuqro and Yeha. These so-called Pre-Aksumite sites display South Arabian features, including inscriptions in Sabean, written in the Ancient South Arabian abjad (written right to left), but the exact mechanisms behind this phenomenon remain unclear."

=== Large-scale migration or colonisation ===
In 2011, Sarah Japp, Iris Gerlach, Holger Hitgen, and Mike Schnelle authored a paper which analysed evidence from Yeha and Hawelti. They find the evidence of Sabaean influence too compelling to be explained by the presence of individuals or small groups, and note that settlers are more associated with social, political, cultural, and religious change than merchants and tradesmen, leading them to conclude that there was a large migration of Sabaean groups. They relate this to Sheba's expansionism during the 8th and 7th centuries BCE, and their policy to settle Sabaeans in conquered territories, proposing that Sabaeans founded an autonomous realm called dʿmt and acculturation took place between Sabaean settlers and the indigenous population.

In her 2016 work on reconstructing South Arabian history from epigraphic evidence, Alessandra Avanzini says that "the Sabaean presence in Ethiopia seems to be a 'colonisation' of a faraway land, economically motivated by the exploitation of local resources, ivory above all". She notes Christian Robin's hypothesis that one of Karib'il Watar's expeditions reached the Red Sea coast and possibly Ethiopia, and says that Sabaic texts indicate people from Sheba arrived in the Horn before the founding of dʿmt.
