= Lome (Aanaa) =

District in Oromia Region, Ethiopia

Coordinates: 8°35′N 39°10′E

Lome (Oromo: Loomii), also spelled Lume, is a district of Ethiopia in Oromia State, Ethiopia. Part of the East Shewa Zone located in the Great Rift Valley, Lome is bordered on the south by the Koka Reservoir, on the west by Ada'a Chukala, on the northwest by Gimbichu, on the north by the Amhara Region, and on the east by Adama. Mojo is the capital of the woreda; other towns and cities include Ejerie and Koka.

== Overview ==
Most of this district ranges in altitude from 1500 to 2300 meters above sea level, except for a small portion in the northern part, which is over 2300 in altitude. Rivers include the Modjo. A survey of the land in this district shows that 54.3% is arable or cultivable, 3% pasture, 2% forest, and the remaining 20% is considered degraded or otherwise unusable. Vegetables are an important cash crop.

Industry in the district includes 4 government-owned industries and 35 privately owned small businesses that employed 173 people, as well as 1278 registered business organizations which included 187 wholesalers, 495 retailers, and 298 service providers. There were 36 Farmers Associations with 11,138 members and 12 Farmers Service Cooperatives with 9974 members. Lome has 89 kilometers of dry-weather and 96 of all-weather road, for an average road density of 260.5 kilometers per 1000 square kilometers. About 48% of the rural, 83% of the urban and 60% of the total population has access to drinking water. Lomo also has rail access provided by the Addis Ababa - Djibouti Railway.

== Demographics ==
The 2007 national census reported a total population for this district of 117,080, of whom 60,125 were men and 56,955 were women; 38,771 or 33.06% of its population were urban dwellers. The majority of the inhabitants said they practised Ethiopian Orthodox Christianity, with 90.11% of the population reporting they observed this belief, while 3.4% of the population practiced traditional beliefs, 3.27% of the population were Protestant, and 2.72% of the population were Muslim.

Based on figures published by the Central Statistical Agency in 2005, this district has an estimated total population of 140,030, of whom 68,077 are men and 71,953 are women; 53,071 or 37.90% of its population are urban dwellers, which is greater than the Zone average of 32.1%. With an estimated area of 709.85 square kilometers, Lome has an estimated population density of 197.3 people per square kilometer, which is greater than the Zone average of 181.7.

The 1994 national census reported a total population for this district of 93,007, of whom 47,743 were men and 45,264 women; 29,691 or 31.92% of its population were urban dwellers at the time. The three largest ethnic groups reported in Lome were the Oromo (66.1%), the Amhara (29.66%), and the Silt'e (1.15%); all other ethnic groups made up 3.09% of the population. Oromo was spoken as a first language by 57.53%, and 40.53% spoke Amharic; the remaining 1.94% spoke all other primary languages reported. The majority of the inhabitants were Ethiopian Orthodox Christianity, with 94.02% of the population reporting they practiced that belief, while 2.53% of the population said they observed traditional beliefs, and 2.34% were Moslem.
