= Gimbichu =

District in Oromia Region, Ethiopia

Coordinates: 8°50′N 39°10′E

Gimbichu (Oromo: Gimbichuu, Amharic: ግንቢቹ) is a woreda in Oromia Region, Ethiopia. Part of the East Shewa Zone, Gimbichu is bordered on the south by Lome, on the southwest by Ada'a Chukala, on the northwest by the Amhara Region, and on the north bordering North Shewa Zone. The administrative center is Chefe Donsa.

== Overview ==
Most parts of this woreda are more than 2300 meters above sea level; Gara Bokan is the highest point. Rivers include Wedecha and Belbela, both tributaries of the Modjo. A survey of the land in Gimbichu shows that 37.6% is arable or cultivable, 14.2% pasture, 2.6% forest, and the remaining 45.6% is considered degraded or otherwise unusable. Lentils, chickpeas and fenugreek are important cash crops.

Industry in the woreda includes 6 privately owned food processing centers employing a total of 14 people, as well as 9 wholesalers, 84 retailers and 117 service providers. There were 33 Farmers Associations with 11,177 members and 14 Farmers Service Cooperatives with 10,207 members. Gimbichu has 119 kilometers of dry-weather and 26 of all-weather road, for an average road density of 205 kilometers per 1000 square kilometers. About 6% of the rural, 100% of the urban and 11% of the total population has access to drinking water.

== Demographics ==
The 2007 national census reported a total population for this woreda of 86,902, of whom 45,126 were men and 41,776 were women; 6,330 or 7.28% of its population were urban dwellers. The majority of the inhabitants said they practised Ethiopian Orthodox Christianity, with 95.78% of the population reporting they observed this belief, while 1.6% of the population were Protestant, 1.41% of the population practiced traditional beliefs, and 1.17% of the population were Muslim.

Based on figures published by the Central Statistical Agency in 2005, this woreda has an estimated total population of 87,294, of whom 42,805 are men and 44,489 are women; 5,897 or 6.76% of its population are urban dwellers, which is less than the Zone average of 32.1%. With an estimated area of 707.49 square kilometers, Gimbichu has an estimated population density of 123.4 people per square kilometer, which is less than the Zone average of 181.7.

The 1994 national census reported a total population for this woreda of 62,561, of whom 32,070 were men and 30,491 women; 3,305 or 5.28% of its population were urban dwellers at the time. The two largest ethnic groups reported in Gimbichu were the Oromo (72.28%), and the Amhara (26.69%); all other ethnic groups made up 1.03% of the population. Oromiffa was spoken as a first language by 72.62%, and 27.29% spoke Amharic; the remaining 0.09% spoke all other primary languages reported. The majority of the inhabitants were Ethiopian Orthodox Christianity, with 97.32% of the population reporting they professed that belief, while 1.33% of the population said they practiced traditional beliefs, and 1.02% were Moslem.
