= Adadi Mariam =

Church in North Shewa Zone, Amhara Region, Ethiopia

Adadi Mariam Rock Hewn Church
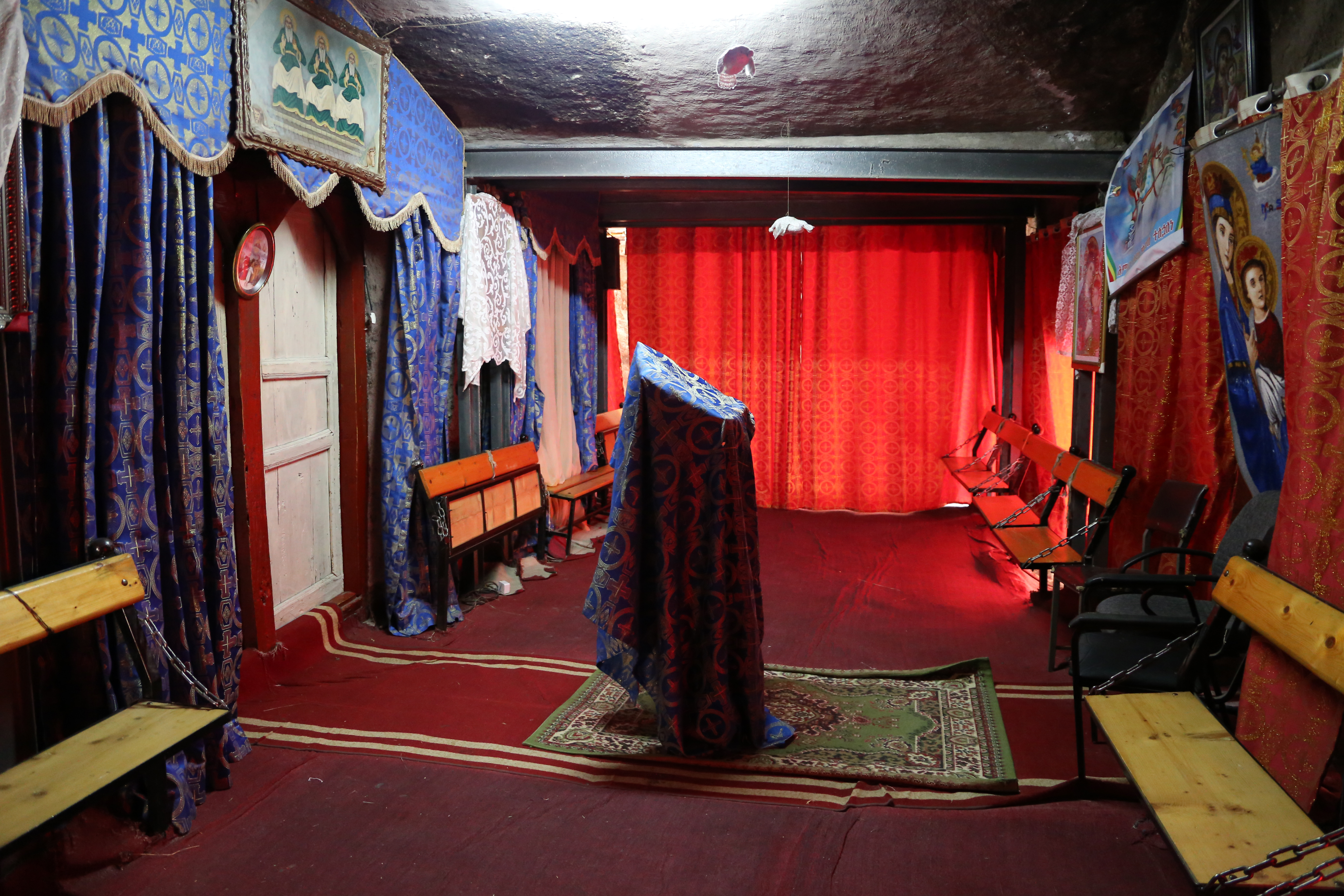

- Location within Ethiopia
- 8°37′49″N 38°30′09″E
- Location: Adadi Mariam, North Shewa Zone, Oromia Region, Ethiopia
- Country: Ethiopia
- Denomination: Ethiopian Orthodox Tewahedo Church

Architecture
- Architectural type: Church
- Years built: 12th century

Adadi Mariam is a rock-hewn monolithic church located approximately 66 km southwest of Addis Ababa, Ethiopia. A popular tourist destination, the site is believed to have been built in the 12th century.

Throughout its history the church has been damaged by both man-made and natural causes. Recently, restoration work to strengthen and restore the church have been done with the aid of Switzerland.

== History ==
Local tradition states that king Lalibela, one of the prominent kings of the Zagwe dynasty and a saint in the Ethiopian Orthodox Tewahedo Church, commissioned the construction of the church in the 12th century. According to the hagiography of St. Lalibela, Adadi Mariam was one of 76 rock-hewn churches which he had constructed and excavated in his lifetime, including those in Lasta. His visit to southern region of Shewa was documented in the book known as Tefut, found in the Gishen Debre Kerbe monastery and in the Sodo Debre Ader (Mahder) church of Zuquala.

According to oral traditions, the establishment of Adadi Mariam church is also related to the coming of one of the most prominent saints of the Ethiopian Orthodox Tewahido Church, Abune Gebre Menfes Kidus, from Egypt to Ethiopia. Before the journeying to the central region of Shewa near Mount Zuquala and founding a monastery there, St. Gebre Menfes Kidus had stayed in Lasta with St. Lalibela. A few years after founding the monastery, St. Lalibela paid a visit to the site in order to receive blessings from St. Gebre Menfes Kidus.

During his stay St. Lalibela saw a vision that St. Mary and her child had visited the spot near the monastery (the site where Adadi Mariam now exists) and that Angels were helping St. Gebre Menfes Kidus. It was after this vision that St. Lalibela immediately commissioned the work of building the church in the late 12th century into the early 13th century. Work continued on the site until St. Lalibela had another vision instructing him to move back to his homeland of Lasta, upon which time he ordered the tabot of Saint Mary to be placed into the church and consecrated immediately.

== Gallery ==
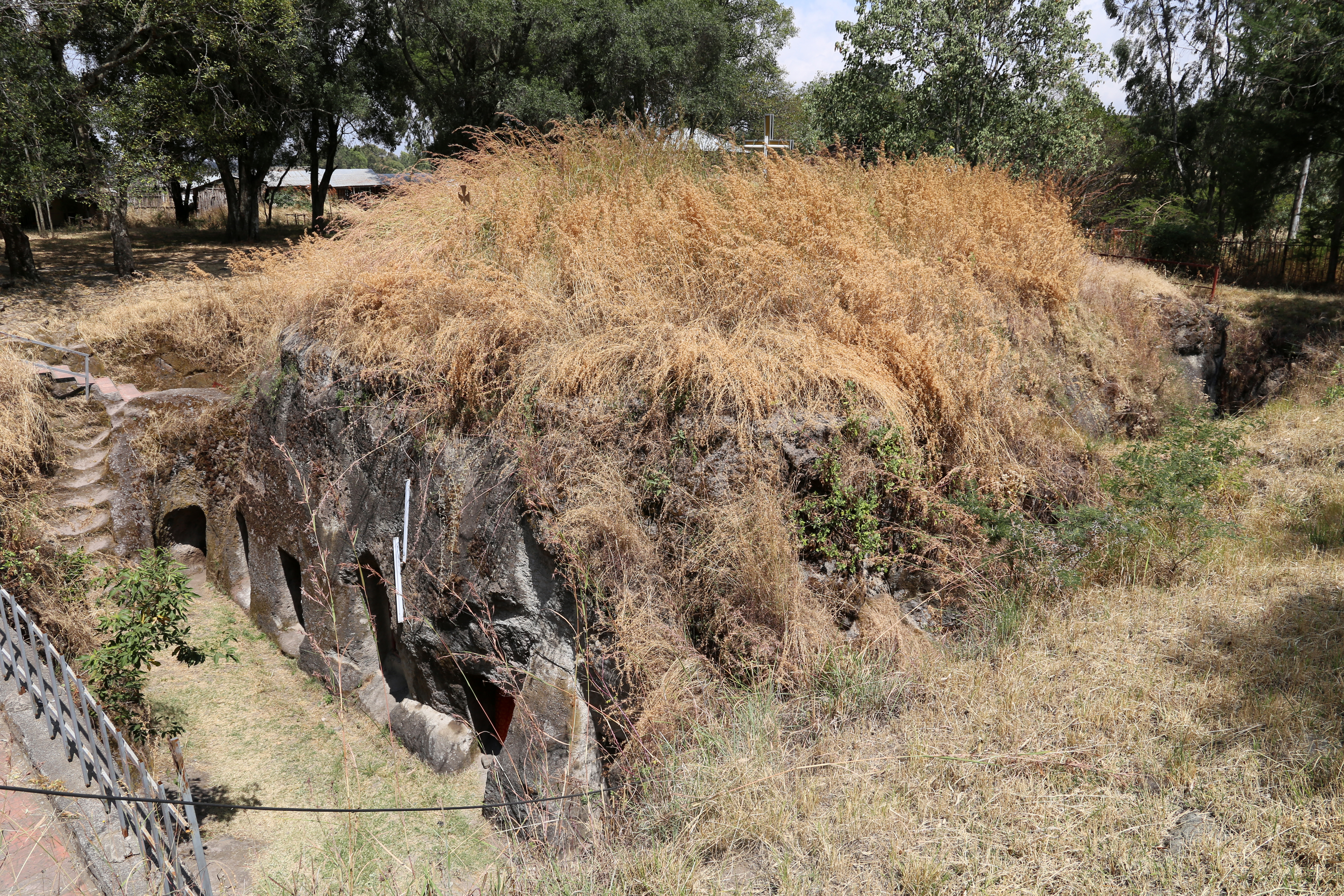
Exterior
