= Ada'a =

District in Oromia Region, Ethiopia

Coordinates: 8°35′N 38°55′E

Ada'a is a woreda in Oromia Region, Ethiopia. It is part of the former Ada'a Chukala woreda what was divided between Ada'a and Liben woredas. Part of the East Shewa Zone located in the Great Rift Valley, Ada'a is bordered on the south by Dugda Bora, on the west by the West Shewa Zone, on the northwest by Akaki, on the northeast by Gimbichu, and on the east by Lome.

== Clans ==
The administrative boundaries of Ada'a district embrace a territory that belongs to the Oromo sub-group of Ada'a, which is placed in the descent system of the Shewa Oromo in the line of one of the descendants of the apical ancestor Tulama. The Ada'a themselves are subdivided into three smaller units, Handha, Illuu and Dhakkuu, and these are collectively called ‘the three of Ada'a’. They are ranked according to their seniority in the above order, i.e. Handha being the most senior, Illuu the second and Dhakkuu the ‘youngest’.

== Overview ==
Altitudes in this woreda range from 1500 to over 2000 meters above sea level. Although the highest point in Ada'a, and in Misraq Shewa, is Mount Yerer which located on the border with Akaki, Mount Zuqualla is also a prominent peak as well as a notable landmark, as the monastery of Saint Gebre Manfas Qeddus is located on it. Rivers include the Modjo, Belbela, Wedecha and Dukem. Other bodies of water include the five crater lakes around Debre Zeyit: Lake Bishoftu, Lake Hora, Lake Bishoftu Guda, Lake Koriftu and the seasonal Lake Cheleklaka. Important forests include the government-protected Dirre-Garbicha and the Tedecha and Oude community forests. A survey of the land in this woreda shows that 51% is arable or cultivable, 6.4% pasture, 7.4% in community, regional and natural forests, and the remaining 34.8% is considered degraded or otherwise unusable. Legumes and sugar cane are important cash crops; Ada'a produces the most teff, wheat and legumes in Misraq Shewa.

Industry in the woreda includes 8 licensed mining enterprises, both private and state-owned, two flour mills (one publicly owned, the other privatized in 1996), 26 small industries that employed 327 people, as well as 202 wholesalers, 172 retailers and 12 service providers. There were 42 Farmers Associations with 26,525 members and 26 Farmers Service Cooperatives. All of the farmers' cooperatives are member of the Erer Farmers' Cooperative Union, which includes cooperatives from two other woredas. The major micro-finance institution operating in Ada'a Chukala is the Oromiyaa Credit and Saving SC, which opened a branch in Debre Zeit around 2001; however the Commercial Bank of Ethiopia extends credit to the cooperatives to market their grain. Ada'a Chukala has 40 kilometers of dry-weather and 93 of all-weather road, for an average road density of 81.3 kilometers per 1000 square kilometers. About 27% of the rural, 100% of the urban and 52% of the total population has access to drinking water.

== Demographics ==
The 2007 national census reported a total population for this woreda of 130,321, of whom 67,869 were men and 62,452 were women; none of its population were urban dwellers. The majority of the inhabitants said they practised Ethiopian Orthodox Christianity, with 89.15% of the population reporting they observed this belief, while 5.53% of the population practiced traditional beliefs, and 4.7% of the population were Protestant.

Based on figures published by the Central Statistical Agency in 2005, Ada'a Chukala had an estimated total population of 355,343, of whom 175,788 were men and 179,555 were women; 142,866 or 40.21% of its population were urban dwellers, which is greater than the Zone average of 32.1%. With an estimated area of 1,635.16 square kilometers, Ada'a Chukala had an estimated population density of 217.3 people per square kilometer, which is greater than the Zone average of 181.7.

The 1994 national census reported a total population for this woreda of 234,614, of whom 118,188 were men and 116,426 women; 79,931 or 34.07% of its population were urban dwellers at the time. The five largest ethnic groups reported in Ada'a Chukala were the Oromo (69.64%), the Amhara (23.84%), the Sebat Bet Gurage (1.64%), the Tigray (1.3%), and the Soddo Gurage (1.29%); all other ethnic groups made up 2.29% of the population. Afaan Oromo was spoken as a first language by 85.37%, 12.86% spoke Amharic, and 0.89% spoke Tigrinya; the remaining 1.88% spoke all other primary languages reported. The majority of the inhabitants were Ethiopian Orthodox Christianity, with 95.23% of the population reporting they practiced that belief, while 2.63% of the population said they practiced traditional beliefs, 2.57% were Protestant, and 1.33% were Moslem.
