= Mojo, Ethiopia =

Town in Oromia Region, Ethiopia

Mojo Modjo (Oromo)
- Town
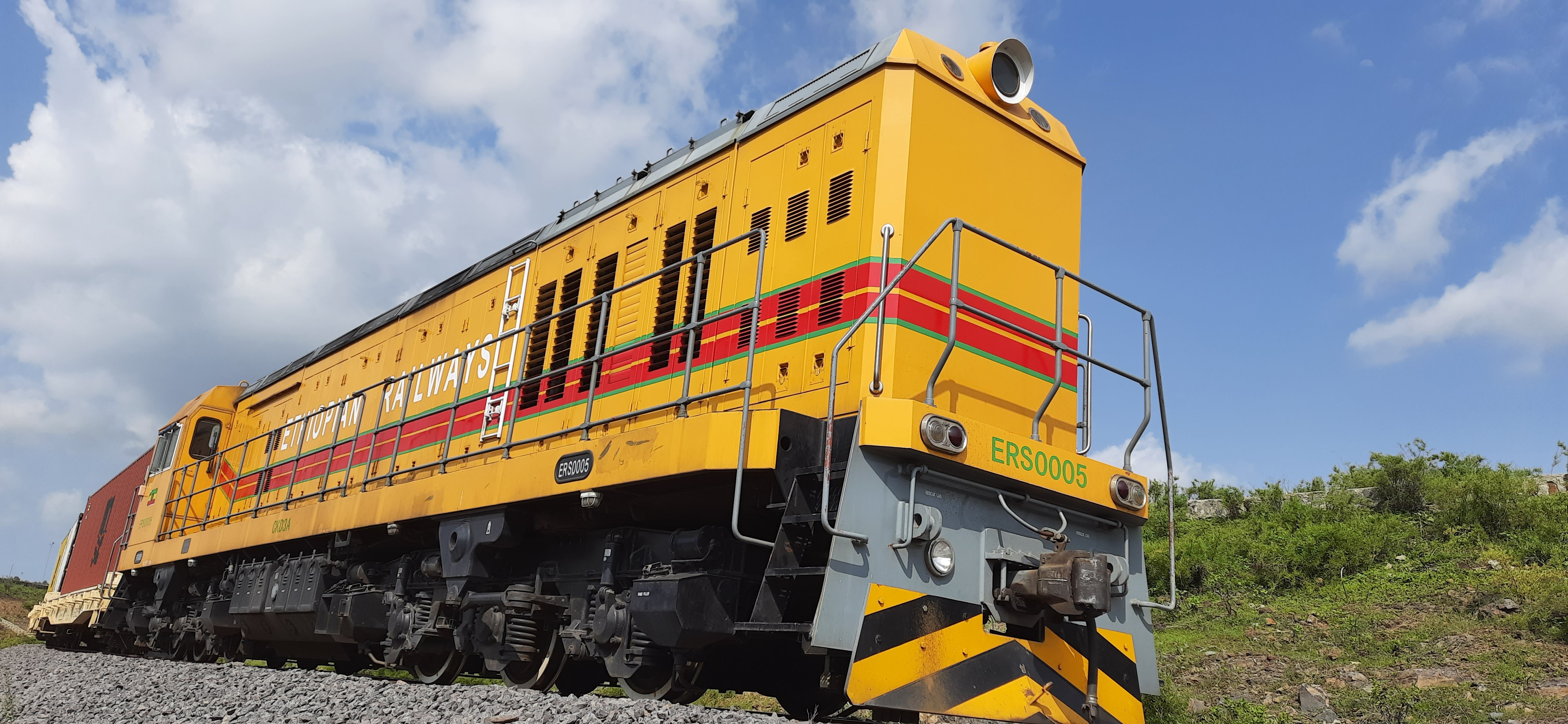
- Ethiopian Railways mojo train station.

- Location within Ethiopia
- Coordinates: 8°39′N 39°5′E
- Country: Ethiopia
- Region: Oromia
- Zone: East Shewa Zone
- Woreda: Lome
- Elevation: 1,800 m (5,900 ft)

Population (2008)
  - Total: 49,521
- Time zone: UTC+3 (EAT)

Mojo (Oromo: Moojoo, Amharic: ሞጆ) is a town in central Ethiopia, named after the nearby Modjo River. Located in the East Shewa Zone of the Oromia Region, it has a latitude and longitude of 8°39′N 39°5′E with an elevation between 1788 and 1825 meters above sea level. It is the administrative center of Lome district.

== Overview ==
Mojo is not only accessible by road (a road connecting the town to Adama was built before the Italian conquest) but has been the location of a train station of the Addis Ababa - Djibouti Railway since the line was extended from Dire Dawa to Akaki in 1915. With the railroad, Mojo also gained telegraph (later telephone) service and a restaurant to serve travelers. Modjo now has a dry port.

== Population ==
Based on figures from the Central Statistical Agency in 2005, Mojo had an estimated total population of 39,316 of which 20,038 were females. The 1994 national census reported this town had a total population of 21,997 of whom 10,455 were males and 11,542 were females.

== History ==
The earliest mention of Mojo is in the Futuh al-Habasha, which mentions that Imam Ahmad ibn Ibrihim al-Ghazi burned a village named "Masin" and a church belonging to the Emperor prior to the Battle of Shimbra Kure; at the time, Mojo was part of the former province of Fatagar.

In June 1965, construction of the Ethio-Japanese Synthetic Textiles Mill began, with a budget of 15 million Birr. The Textiles Co. behind it was 49% Japanese and 51% Ethiopian owned, with a capital of 2.5 million Birr. The company formally introduced its products to the market at the beginning of August 1966; the factory went into 24-hour operation in December 1966 and had 152 looms. On 30 October 1996, an Ethiopian Air Force aircraft crashed into the marketplace, killing 8 people and injuring 94. About 50 residential and commercial buildings were destroyed by fire.
