= Hawulti =

Hawulti may refer to:

- Hawulti (monument), a fallen (now restored) monument in Matara, Eritrea
- Hawulti-Melazo, two ancient cities in northern Ethiopia and an archaeological site of the Kingdom of Aksum
