= Liben, East Shewa, Oromia =

District located in Oromia state of Ethiopia

Liben is one of the districts in the Oromia of Ethiopia. It was part of the former Ada'a Chukala district. It is part of the East Shewa Zone located in the Great Rift Valley.

== Demographics ==
The 2007 national census reported a total population for this district of 76,351, of whom 39,754 were men and 36,597 were women; 2,930 or 3.84% of its population were urban dwellers. The majority of the inhabitants said they practised Ethiopian Orthodox Christianity, with 71.05% of the population reporting they observed this belief, while 18.49% of the population were Protestant, and 9.94% of the population practiced traditional beliefs.
