= Gebre Menfes Kidus =

Egyptian/Ethiopian Christian saint

Abune Gebre Menfes Kidus
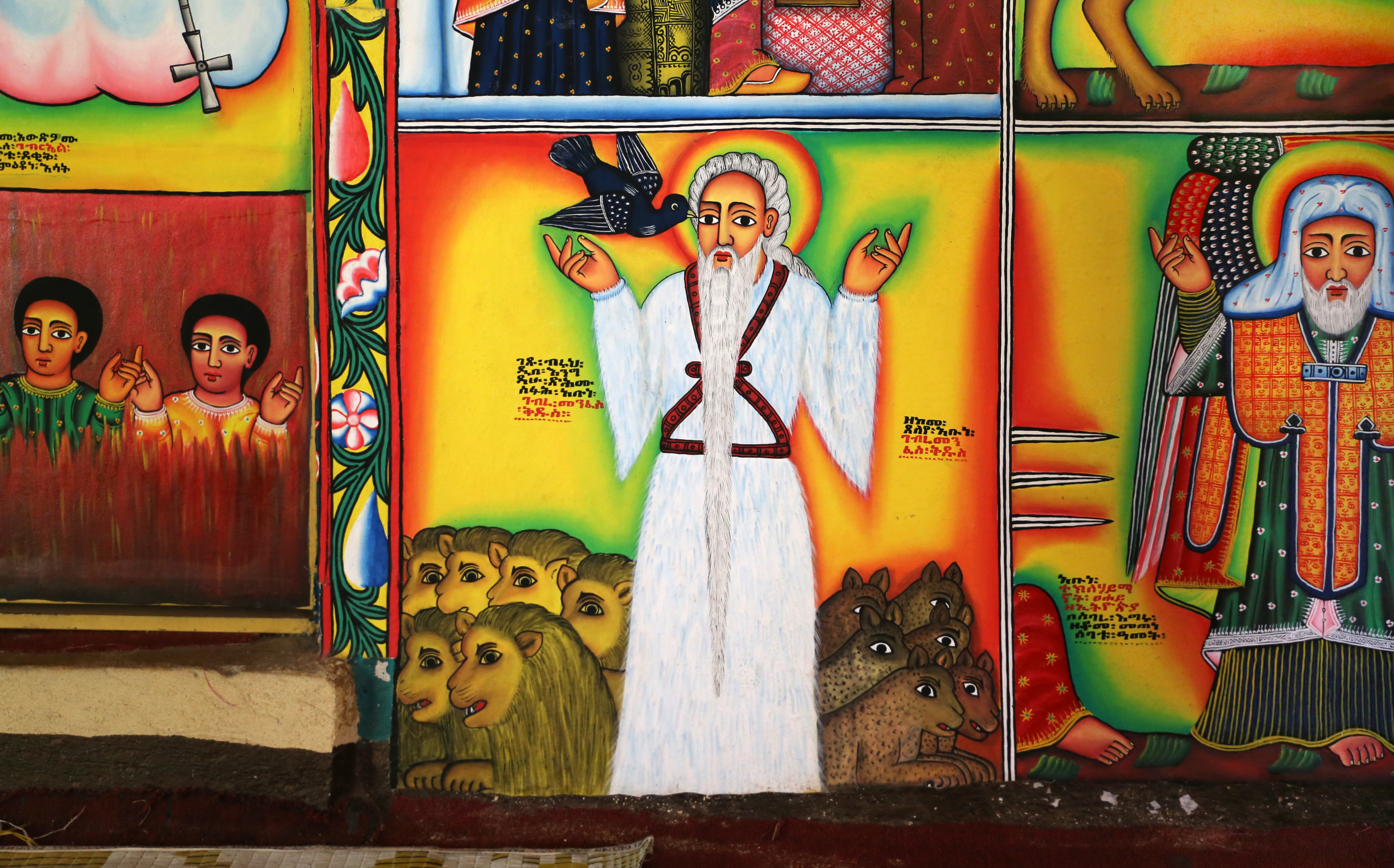
- Abune Gebre Menfes Kidus painting right next to the painting of Tekle Haymanot in the Entos Eyesu Monastery of the Ethiopian Orthodox Tewahedo Church

“the Star of the desert” “the Head of Anchorites”
- Born: Abune Gebre Menfes Kidus; 7 January 829; Nehisa, Nile Delta, Egypt
- Died: The 13th of March R.C. Ziquala, Ethiopia
- Venerated in: Ethiopian Orthodox Tewahedo Church, Eritrean Orthodox Tewahedo Church
- Feast: 13 March R.C.

Abune Gebre Menfes Kidus (Ge'ez: አቡነ ገብረ መንፈስ ቅዱስ; also familiarly called Abo; born 7 January 829) was an Egyptian Christian saint, and the founder of the monastery of Zuqualla. The fifth day of every month in the Ethiopian calendar is dedicated to this saint.

Manuscripts differ in relating the story of the life of Gebre Menfes Kidus and the miracles he performed. Unless otherwise stated, the account below is pieced together from various legends about his life.

== Life in Egypt ==
One text reports Gebre Menfes Kidus lived 562 years, 300 of them in Egypt, while another attributes him a life of 362 years. He was born in Nehisa, Egypt to noble parents, named Simon and Eklesia. Eklesia, according to legend, came from the Israelite Tribe of Benjamin. Eklesia and Simon are said to have been barren for 30 years. The day of Gebre's conception and the date of his birth are said to coincide with those of Jesus Christ.

Forty days after his birth, the baptism of Gebre Menfes Kidus was celebrated with a banquet attended by the Roman emperor. He developed traits common to all prodigious children. By the age of two, tradition reports that he was already wise. When he was three years old, God sent his archangel Gabriel to the child, to take him into the desert and put him into the custody of the monk Zamada Berhan, leaving his parents and nurse in despair. There he was ordained priest and became an abbot.

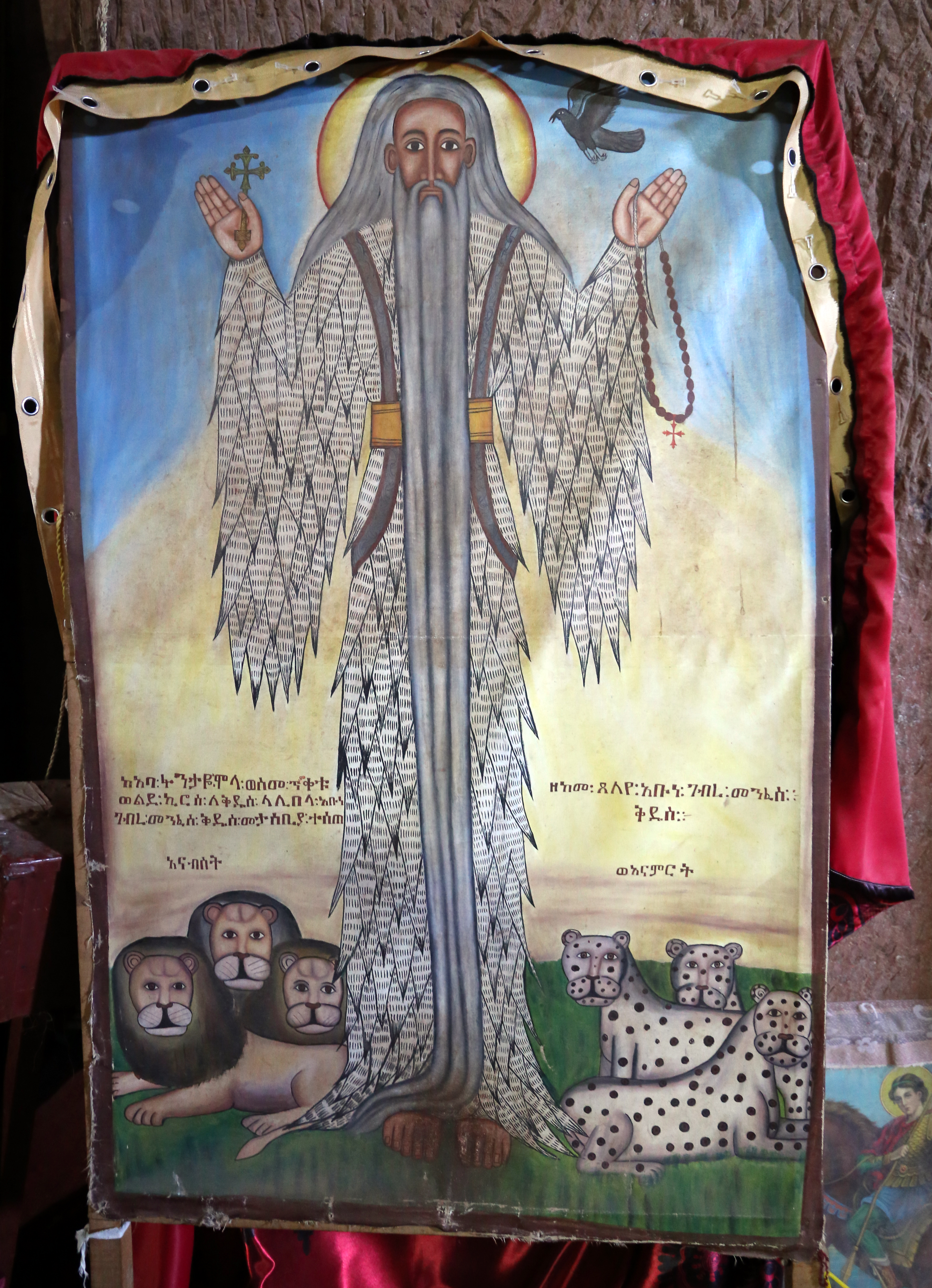
Gabra Manfas Qeddus covered in hair.

For a time Gebre remained in the desert performing miracles, while people from remote countries visited him. Then a second time God sent Gabriel to take Gebre deeper into the desert, and to have him live amongst 60 lions and 60 leopards. While there, Gebre Menfes Kidus developed thick white hair covering all his body like a coat. He was able to appease the wild beasts, and in this respect resembled the figure of Daniel from the Old Testaments, as he was able to talk to the animals.

In Ethiopian iconography, Qeddus is commonly depicted in full view standing upright, covered by his hair from top to toe, while lions and leopards rest at his feet.

== Journeys to the Holy Land ==
Gebre Menfes Kidus set out for a journey into the Holy Land. He visited all the holy places, including Bethlehem, Jerusalem, Nazareth and the river Jordan. God incited him to go to Gabaon, where the devil assaulted him with wild beasts. Attacked by a serpent, Gebre won the battle, and the serpent was petrified by him. Gebre Menfes Kidus begged the Lord to make him invisible, so as to prevent humans and supernatural beings alike from recognizing him and putting him to the test.

== Life in Ethiopia ==
When Gebre Menfes Kidus was 300 years of age, the Lord ordered him to go to Ethiopia to preach to the people there. He travelled there on a winged chariot, accompanied by his leopards and lions. In Ethiopia he founded the monastery of Zuqualla, in an extinct volcano, which is in the southern part of the former province of Shewa (now in Ada'a Chukala woreda).

Some texts say that, before establishing his monastery, Gebre Menfes Kidus was tempted by demons and devils for a period of hundred years, after which time the Lord exempted the Ethiopians from sin. Gebre left Zuqualla to wander to Kabd in order to stare at the heavens for seven months without blinking. The devil, in the shape of a raven, came to pick out his eyes. But Menfes Kidus was cured by the archangels Gabriel and Michael, who brought him back to Zuqualla.

Some manuscripts recount a visit to heaven, where Gabra Manfas Qeddus was kissed by the Holy Trinity. While he was still on his way back from heaven, three other saints arrived in Kabd to visit him -- Samuel of Waldebba, Anbas of Hazalo, and Benyam of lower Begemder—who were all accompanied by lions. As soon as the lions and leopards of Gebre Menfes Kidus noticed their fellow creatures, though, they devoured them. Nothing was left of them when Menfes Kidus eventually arrived on the scene. When Gebre ordered his animals to spit out the remains of their meal, the pets of the saints reappeared sound and healthy.

Three times a year Gebre Menfes Kidus returned to the Holy Land to receive Holy Communion: on Christmas Day, on the day of Jesus' baptism, and on Good Friday. There he spoke Hebrew but also all the languages of the world, a characteristic associated with the story of the tower of Babel.

He died on a Sunday, on the 5th of Maggabit. He was lying on the floor with his arms outspread, in the position of Jesus on the cross.

== Depictions ==
Gebre Menfes Kidus is usually depicted of an old saint with a halo around his head with his long beard as his clothing, and some Ethiopian Lions on his left, and some hyenas or leopards on his left, and a Dove near his face which is believed to be the Holy Spirit, with some depictions representing a black crow as when the devil tried to interrupt him from staring at and praying to the heavens by drinking his tears. Some Images Depict that he holds a Blessing cross on his left hand, and on his right, is Prayer Beads.
