= Hawulti-Melazo =

Archaeological site in Ethiopia

Hawulti-Melazo (Hawelti-Melazo) is a pre-Aksumite and Aksumite archaeological site located in the northern Tigray Region of Ethiopia. It contains various old funerary monuments, as well as ancient inscriptions.

== See also ==
- Ezana Stone
- Qohaito
- Hawulti (monument)
