= Mount Zuqualla =

Mountain and extinct volcano in Oromia Region, Ethiopia

- Zuquala, Zikwala, Cuqqaalaa
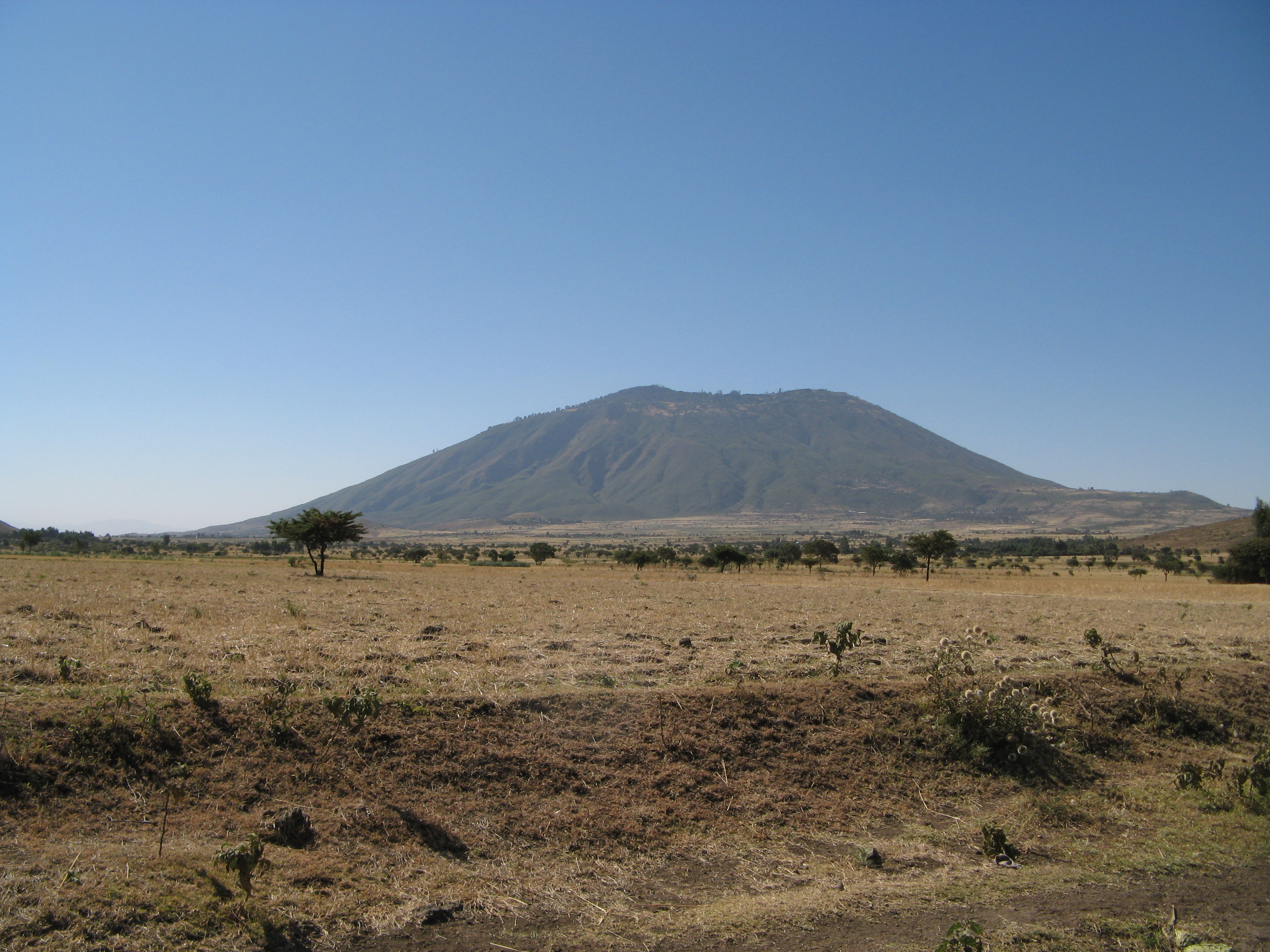

Highest point
- Elevation: 3,010 m (9,880 ft)
- Prominence: 1,150 m (3,770 ft)
- Listing: Volcanoes of Ethiopia; Ribu
- Coordinates: 8.53°N 38.85°E

Geography
- Location within Ethiopia
- Location: Oromia region, Ethiopia

Geology
- Mountain type: Stratovolcano
- Last eruption: Pleistocene

Climbing
- Easiest route: Bole International Airport in Addis Ababa and Bishoftu

Mount Zuqualla (also spelled Cuqqaalaa, Zikwala or Chuqqaala) is an extinct volcano in the Oromia Region of Ethiopia. Situated in Ada'a Chukala woreda of the East Shewa Zone, it rises from the plain 30 kilometres (19 mi) south of Bishoftu. With a height of 3,010 metres (9,875 ft), it is known for its crater lake, lake Dembel, an elliptical crater lake with a maximum diameter of about one kilometre, but the trail around the crater is about 6 km long.

== History ==
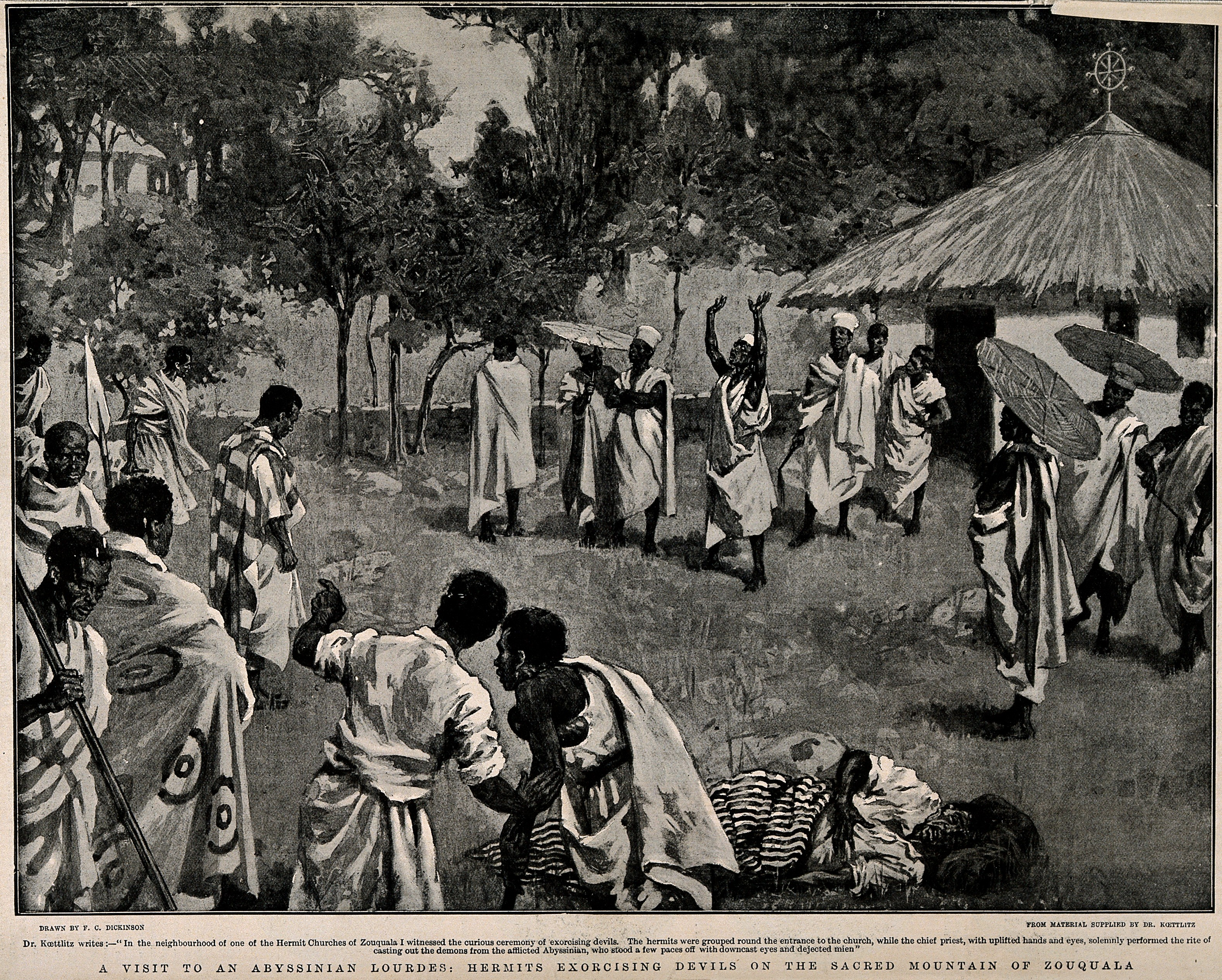
Hermits performing an exorcism on Mount Zuqualla.

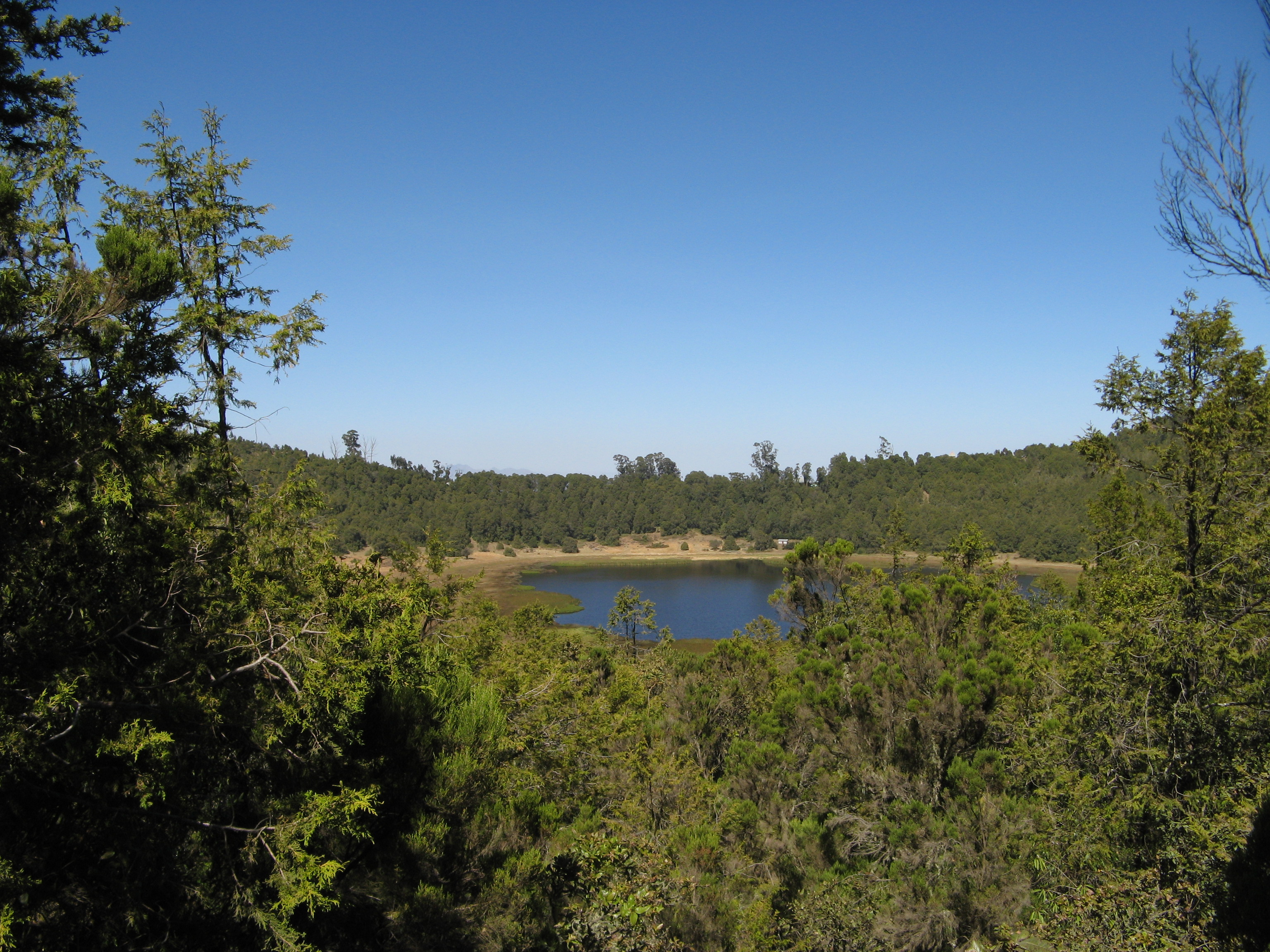
Crater lake on Mount Zuqualla.

During the Paleolithic era, the Melka Kunture fossil site was covered by volcanic deposits as a result of the eruption of Mount Zuqualla.

In the middles ages, this region was part of the Ifat Sultanate and had a considerable Muslim population until the region was conquered by Amda Seyon I. In 1450, Mount Zuqualla appears on the Fra Mauro map.

16th century Adal writer Arab Faqih said that the territory around Mount Zuqualla was inhabited by a tribe of "polytheists" known as the Maya. The Adalites confronted in excess of three thousand Mayan mercenaries equipped with bows and arrows who served under the command of the Abyssinian sovereign.

The lake in the crater has an island monastery, said to have been founded by Gebre Menfes Kidus on the site of a hermitage used by Saint Mercurius. This monastery was destroyed, and a church at the foot of the mountain looted, by Imam Ahmad ibn Ibrahim of Adal Sultanate in 1531; two churches were later built at the monastery, one dedicated to Gebre Menfes Kidus built by Menelik II in 1880 and designed by the Italian Sebastian Castagna, and the other dedicated to Kidane Mihret built during the reign of Haile Selassie. Various other holy sites are found around the mountain, mostly rock formations, while the monastery is the site of a biannual festival.

The explorers Orazio Antinori, Antonelli and Antonio Cecchi used Zuqualla to determine various geographical locations in May 1881. Dr Scott, on behalf of Cambridge University and the British Museum, secured a large and valuable entomological collection near Zuqualla in 1926. In 1937 during the Second Italo-Ethiopian War the area was the site of fierce fighting between the Italians and local Ethiopian Arbegnoch. Three of the leaders of the attempted 1960 Ethiopian coup fled to Zuqualla from the capital, where the Moja family had land. Two of them lost their lives 24 December while Mengistu Neway, seriously wounded, was captured and brought to the capital for trial.

Today both the mountain and the lake is a holy site are considered holy to both Ethiopian Orthodox Tewahedo Church and the local Oromos living nearby. The ambivalent attitude regarding the holiness of the mountain is seen in the Oromo proverb: "Those who live far away worship it, those who live nearby plow it."
