= Yeha =

Historical capital of Kingdom of D'mt in northern Ethiopia

Coordinates: 14°17′8.36″N 39°1′8.61″E

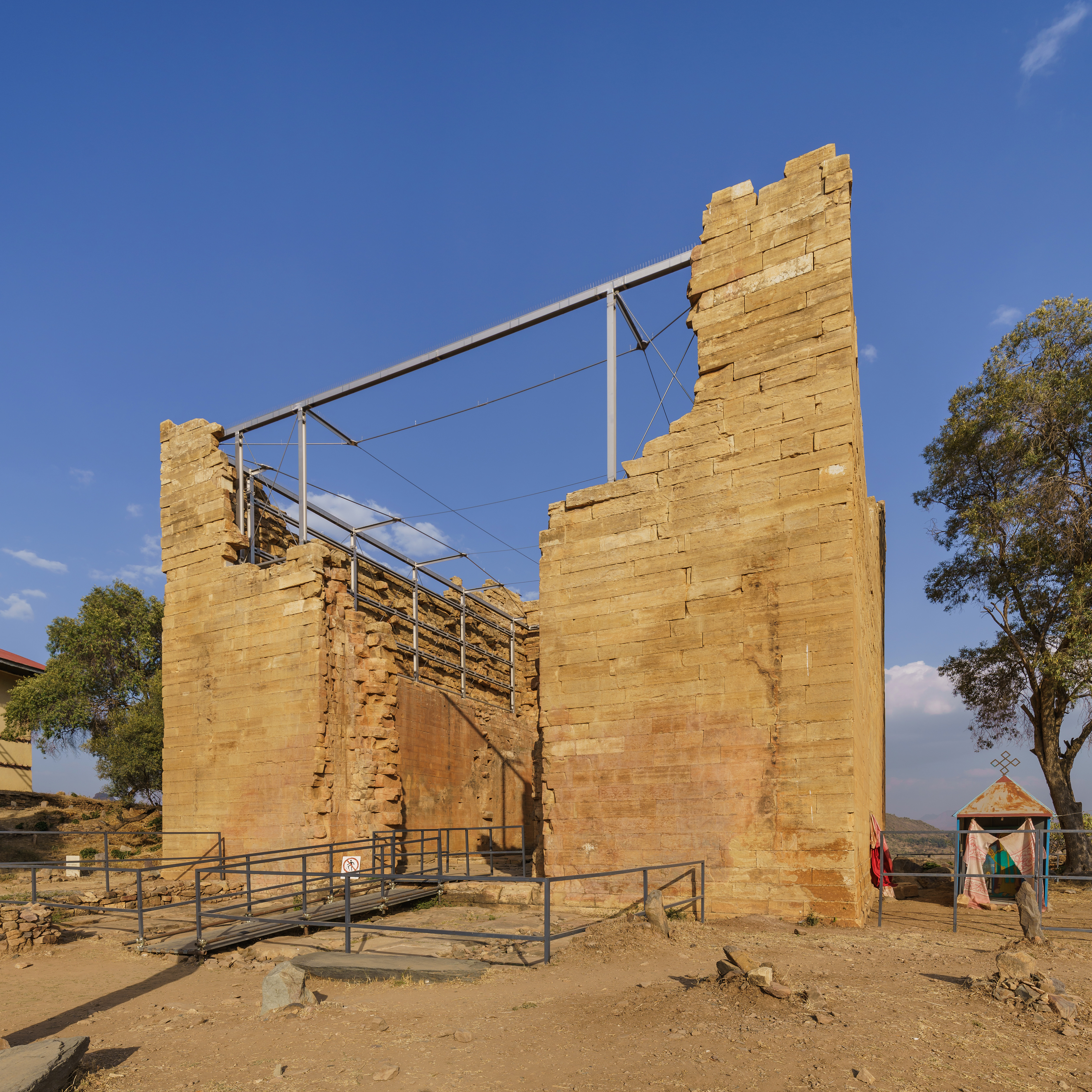
Ruins of the Temple of Yeha in the Tigray Region of Ethiopia.

Yeha (Ge'ez: ይሐ yiḥa, older ESA 𐩥𐩢 ḥw; Old South Arabian: 𐩺𐩢𐩱 yḥʾ) is a town in the northern Central Zone, Tigray in Ethiopia. It likely served as the capital of the pre-Aksumite kingdom of Dʿmt.

== Archeology ==
The oldest standing structure in Ethiopia, the Temple of Yeha, is located in Tigray region. This is a tower built in the Sabaean style, and dated through comparison with ancient structures in South Arabia to around 700 BC. Although no radiocarbon dating testing has been performed on samples from site, this date for the Great Tower is supported by local inscriptions. David Phillipson attributes its "excellent preservation" to two factors, "the care with which its original builders ensured a level foundation, firmly placed on the uneven bedrock; and to its rededication -- perhaps as early as the sixth century AD -- for use as a Christian church." Two other archaeological sites at Yeha include Grat Beal Gebri, a ruined complex distinguished by a portico 10 meters wide and two sets of square pillars, and a graveyard containing several rock-hewn shaft tombs first investigated in the early 1960s. One authority has speculated that one of these tombs contained a royal burial. Another believes the ancient residential area was likely one kilometer to the east of the modern village.

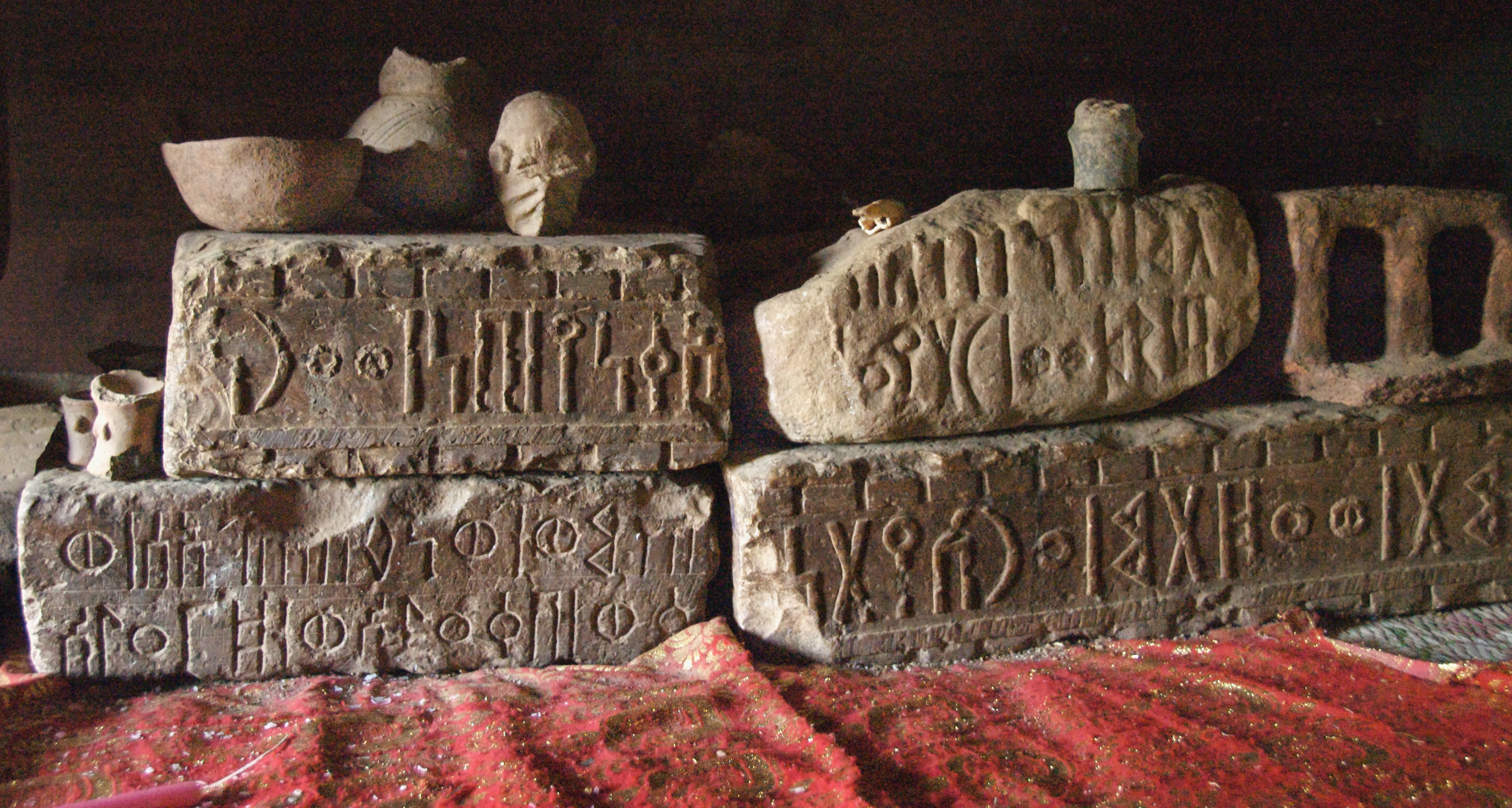
Ancient stone slabs with Sabaean inscriptions found at Yeha, Ethiopia.

Additionally, Yeha is the location of an Ethiopian Orthodox Tewahedo Church monastery. It founded according to tradition by Abba Aftse, one of the Nine Saints. In his account of Ethiopia, Francisco Álvares mentions visiting this town in 1520 (which he called "Abbafaçem"), and provides a description of the ancient tower, the monastery, and the local church. This church was either the rededicated Great Temple, or a now destroyed building which the Deutsche Aksum-Expedition described in the early 20th century. (The current structure exhibits Aksumite architectural features and was built between 1948 and 1949.)

The Central Statistical Agency has not published an estimate for this village's 2005 population.

Explored briefly in February 1893 by the British antiquarian Theodore Bent and his wife Mabel, Yeha has also been the site of several archaeological excavations, beginning in 1952 by the Ethiopian Institute of Archeology. Although interrupted by the Derg, excavations were resumed in 1993 by a French archaeological team.
