= Rodolfo Fattovich =

Italian archaeologist (1945–2018)

Rodolfo Fattovich (1945-2018) was an Italian archaeologist specialising in African archaeology. He was born in Trieste and studied Egyptology and prehistoric archaeology at the University of Trieste. He continued his study of Predynastic Egypt at the Sapienza University of Rome, and was encouraged by a fellow academic to study the Ethiopian-Eritrean highlands. He later researched the ancient period in the northern Horn of Africa and Egypt. In 1975 Fattovich became an assistant professor of Ethiopian archaeology at University of Naples "L'Orientale". With Kassaye Begashaw he founded the first academic unit, under the Addis Ababa University, on archaeology, heritage management, and museum studies in Ethiopia. He began excavations in Ethiopia in 1972, and directed various projects. In 1989 he was awarded the Giorgio Maria Sangiorgi prize by the Accademia Nazionale dei Lincei. Throughout his career he authored over 200 papers and monographs. Fattovich taught Ethiopian archaeology and Egyptian archaeology at the University of Naples "L'Orientale" until retiring in 2014.
