= Dʿmt =

c. 980–400 BCE kingdom in Eritrea and fringes of northern Ethiopia

Kingdom of dʿmt ደዐመተ
- 8th c. BC – 4th c. BC
- Capital: Yeha
- Common languages: Ethio-Sabaic
- Government: Monarchy
- Historical era: Iron Age
  - Established: 8th c. BC
  - Disestablished: 4th c. BC
Preceded by	Succeeded by
Gash Group; Sheba	Kingdom of Aksum

dʿmt (Ge'ez: ደዐመተ, romanized: dʿmt; theoretically vocalized ዳዓማት, *Daʿamat or ዳዕማት, *Daʿəmat) was an Ethio-Sabaean kingdom located in present-day Eritrea and the northern Tigray Region of Ethiopia.

The exact dates of its existence remain unknown. However, a timeframe spanning from the end of the 8th century BC to the 6th century BC is a hypothesis. Few inscriptions by or about this kingdom survive, and very little archaeological work has taken place. As a result, it is not known whether dʿmt ended as a civilization before the Kingdom of Aksum's early stages, evolved into the Aksumite state, or was one of the smaller states united in the Kingdom of Aksum, possibly around 150 BC.

== History ==
Given the presence of a large temple complex, the capital of dʿmt may have been present-day Yeha, in Tigray Region, Ethiopia. At Yeha, the temple to the god Ilmuqah is still standing.

The culture of dʿmt can be dated to approximately 800/700–400 BC on the basis of four radiometric dates from the Domestic Site at Aksum. Radiometric dates from Betä Giyorgis also indicate that a Proto-Aksumite polity had emerged in northern Tégray by the 4th century BC, suggesting dʿmt was already in decline at that point. The kingdom occupied a narrow transect from the edge of the plateau in Akkälä Guzay to the Täkkäze river in Tégray, possibly extending further west into Šire, with marginal sites near Mäqälä. The main sites were Yeha, Hawélti, and Mälazo in Tégray, and Mätära, Addi Kramatén, and Käskäse in central Eritrea. The temple at Yeha resembles early first-millennium BC temples in the Gawf region of Yemen, particularly the temple of the god Nakrah at Baraqish, in its overall layout and in details such as incense burners, offering tables, and decorative motifs including lunar symbols and ibex figures.

Some modern historians including Stuart Munro-Hay, Rodolfo Fattovich, Ayele Bekerie, Cain Felder, and Ephraim Isaac consider this civilization to be indigenous, although Sabaean-influenced due to the latter's dominance of the Red Sea, while others like Joseph Michels, Henri de Contenson, Tekle-Tsadik Mekouria, and Stanley Burstein have viewed dʿmt as the result of a mixture of Sabaeans and indigenous peoples. Some sources consider the Sabaean influence to be minor, limited to a few localities, and disappeared after a few decades or a century, perhaps representing a trading or military colony in some sort of symbiosis or military alliance with the civilization of dʿmt or some other proto-Aksumite state.

Archaeologist Rodolfo Fattovich believed that there was a division in the population of dʿmt and northern Ethiopia due to the kings ruling over the 'sb (Sabaeans) and the 'br, the 'Reds' and the 'Blacks'. Fattovich also noted that the known kings of dʿmt worshipped both South Arabian and indigenous gods named 'str, Hbs, Dt Hmn, Rb, Šmn, Ṣdqn and Šyhn.

=== Collapse ===
In the final phase, monumental buildings at Yeha were abandoned and the town sharply decreased in size. Evidence of fire destruction of two buildings at Yeha may point to warfare as the cause of collapse. The landscape came to be characterised by small rural settlements nucleated around Aksum, though occupation continuity at Mätära suggests that urban society survived in central Eritrea into the later period. After the fall of dʿmt, the plateau came to be dominated by smaller unknown successor kingdoms. This lasted until the rise of one of these polities during the first century BC, the Aksumite Kingdom.

== Archaeology and society ==
=== Settlement and economy ===
The settlement pattern of dʿmt was characterised by towns, villages, hamlets, and ceremonial centres. A town with two monumental temples was located at Yeha, while Mätära and Käskäse served as an additional town and ceremonial centre, respectively. The subsistence economy relied on cultivation of hulled barley, emmer, linseed, pea, tef, nug, and lentils, alongside cattle and to a lesser extent sheep and goats. A clay figurine of two yoked oxen found at Hawélti confirms the use of the plough during this period. Iron was worked in Tégray from an early date; iron slag found at Gobédra has been radiocarbon-dated to the 9th century BC.

Administrative devices included zoomorphic, oval, rectangular, and circular bronze seals, as well as rectangular, ellipsoid, and lozenge clay seals, whose occurrence across many sites suggests a widespread administrative system. Zoomorphic bronze seals, sometimes bearing personal names, were found exclusively in elite tombs at Yeha. Inscribed votive altars from the Aksum–Yeha region bear the names of skilled artisans from Saba (Yemen), who may have formed a small minority of the population yet were regarded as part of the élite.

=== Architecture and funerary practices ===
The most monumental structures were the Temple of Yeha and the Grat Bäʿal Gäbri Palace at Yeha. The palace was built with a technique reminiscent of the "Oval Temple" at Marib, Yemen, while the shrines at Hawélti and the small temple at Mälazo more closely resemble Meroitic temples. The roughly 5-metre-high monoliths at Käskäse, despite a superficial similarity to South Arabian architecture, are most likely a local megalithic tradition.

Elite shaft-tombs were recorded at Yeha and Mätära, consisting of quadrangular or roughly circular shafts over 2 metres deep with one or more burial chambers at the base. Grave goods included imported objects, bronze and iron tools and weapons, and bronze seals, one of which bore a king's name.

Objects found at Yeha, Mätära, and Hawélti, including an alabaster vessel of 8th–7th century BC Nubian type, Meroitic amulets comparable to specimens from the cemeteries at Meroë, and a carnelian amulet of Meroitic type, attest to contacts between dʿmt and the Kingdom of Kush.

== Government and titles ==
The rulers of dʿmt used two titles, mlk (king) and mkrb (mukarrib). In these inscriptions, mlk is not followed by the name of a kingdom and appears to function as a personal title, while mkrb precedes the kingdom's name, as in the formula mkrb DʿMT w-SBʾ. Within this formula, SBʾ (Saba) is named second, which suggests it was a group or territory associated with dʿmt rather than a separate kingdom that preceded it.

== Religion ==
The population of dʿmt worshipped a pantheon largely derived from South Arabia, including the deities ʿAstar, Hawbas, and Almaqah, alongside a goddess known as ʿAttar-samayn. Within dʿmt, this goddess is attested under two name forms, ʿT ḤMYM and ʿT ḤMN, both found at Yeha and at Addi Kramaten. At Addi Kramaten, one altar carries both spellings, one in formal Sabaic script and the other in a rougher graffito, possibly reflecting dialect differences among the population. After the decline of dʿmt, worship of the goddess under the name ʿT ḤMN continued at Feqya and Dankanamo.

== Language ==
The relationship between the language of these inscriptions and Geʿez has been debated. An early view held that Geʿez derived from Sabaic, but this was later revised in favor of a largely indigenous Ethiopian linguistic base with limited Sabaean influence. The more recent acceptance of a longer chronology for South Arabian history has reopened the possibility of a Sabaean presence in the region from the early first millennium BC, and current scholarship treats the language of dʿmt as shaped by both an indigenous substrate and direct Sabaic contact.

== Known rulers ==
The following is a list of four known rulers of dʿmt, in chronological order:

Term	Name	Consort name	Notes
Dates from ca. 700 BC to ca. 650 BC
Dates from ca. 700 BC to ca. 650 BC	Mlkn Wʿrn Ḥywt	ʿArky(t)n	contemporary of the Sabaean mukarrib Karib'il Watar
Dates from ca. 700 BC to ca. 650 BC	Mkrb, Mlkn Rdʿm	Smʿt	
Dates from ca. 700 BC to ca. 650 BC	Mkrb, Mlkn Ṣrʿn Rbḥ	Yrʿt	Son of Wʿrn Ḥywt, "King Ṣrʿn of the tribe YGʿḎ [=Agʿazi, cognate to Ge'ez], mkrb of DʿMT and SB'"
Dates from ca. 700 BC to ca. 650 BC	Mkrb, Mlkn Ṣrʿn Lmn	ʿAdt	Son of Rbḥ, contemporary of the Sabaean mukarrib Sumuhu'alay, "King Ṣrʿn of the tribe YGʿḎ, mkrb of DʿMT and SB'"

== See also ==
- History of Eritrea
- History of Ethiopia
- Kingdom of Aksum
- Land of Punt

== Sources ==
- Avanzini, Alessandra (2016). By land and by sea: a history of South Arabia before Islam recounted from inscriptions. L'Erma Di Bretschneider.
