= David Phillipson =

British archaeologist

David Walter Phillipson FBA FSA (born 17 October 1942) is a British archaeologist specializing in African archaeology. His most notable work has been in Ethiopia, particularly on the archaeology of Aksumite sites. He was curator of the Museum of Archaeology and Anthropology, University of Cambridge from 1981 to 2006, and Fellow of Gonville and Caius College, Cambridge, 1988–2006.

== Selected publications ==
- African Archaeology
- Foundations of an African Civilisation: Aksum and the northern Horn, 1000 BC - AD 1300
- Ancient Churches of Ethiopia. Yale University Press, New Haven, 2009. ISBN 9780300141566
