= Modjo River =

River in central Ethiopia

Coordinates: 8°25′16″N 39°0′0″E

The Modjo is a river of central Ethiopia. A tributary of the Awash River, its own tributaries include the Wedecha and Belbela.

A report by Action Professionals Association for the People, a non-governmental organization, claimed that laboratory analyses of toxic industrial chemicals in the river waters and clinical data of people in the watershed revealed that the Modjo is one of the two most polluted rivers in Ethiopia.

== See also ==
- List of rivers of Ethiopia
- List of most-polluted rivers
