= Araya Zerihun =

Ethiopian development leader

Araya Zerihun (1953–2006) was an Ethiopian development leader in the Tigray Region. He played a central role in the establishment of the Tigray Development Association (TDA).

== Career ==
He served as the chairman of the TDA, a non-profit organization established in 1989 to address poverty and improve education and healthcare systems in Tigray. He was a central figure during the organization's formative years. He also held the position of General Manager of the MAA Garment Factory.

Araya Zerihun mobilised resources and support for the TDA's initiatives in education, healthcare, and capacity building.
