= Rock-Hewn Churches, Lalibela =

Eleven monolithic churches found in Lalibela, Amhara Region, Ethiopia

UNESCO World Heritage Site
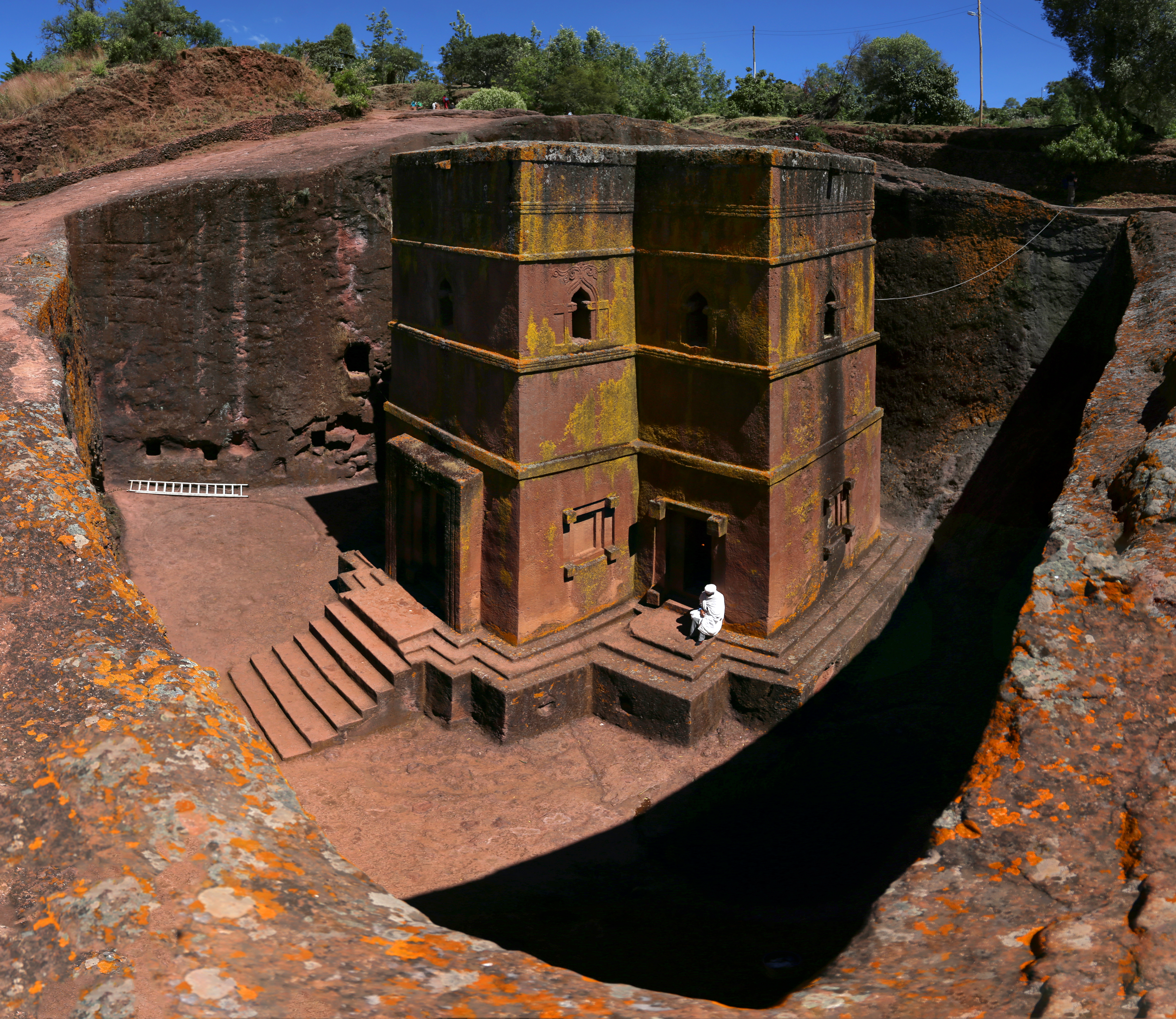
- Church of Saint George

- Location within Ethiopia
- Criteria: Cultural: i, ii, iii
- Reference: 18
- Inscription: 1978 (2nd Session)
- Coordinates: 12°01′57″N 39°02′36″E

The eleven Rock-hewn Churches of Lalibela are monolithic churches located in the western Ethiopian Highlands near the town of Lalibela, named after the late-12th and early-13th century King Gebre Meskel Lalibela of the Zagwe dynasty, who commissioned the massive building project of 11 rock-hewn churches to recreate the holy city of Jerusalem in his own kingdom. The site remains in use by the Ethiopian Orthodox Christian Church to this day, and it remains an important place of pilgrimage for Ethiopian Orthodox worshipers. It took 24 years to build all the 11 rock hewn churches.

== History ==
According to local tradition, Lalibela (traditionally known as Roha) was founded by an Agew family called the Zagwa or Zagwe in 1137 AD. Tradition holds that in Ethiopia prior to his accession to the throne, Gebre Meskel Lalibela was guided by Christ on a tour of Jerusalem, and instructed to build a second Jerusalem in Ethiopia. The churches are said to have been built during the Zagwe dynasty, under the rule of King Gebre Mesqel Lalibela (r. ca. 1181–1221 AD), although it is more likely that they evolved into their current form over the course of several phases of construction and alteration of preexisting structures.

The site of the rock-hewn churches of Lalibela was first included on the UNESCO World Heritage List in 1978.

== Archaeological site ==
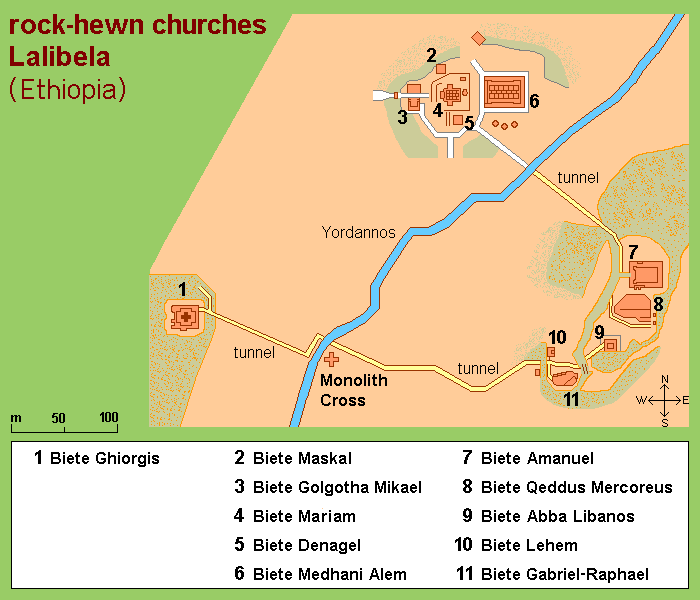
Lalibela area map

At an altitude of around 2,480 metres (8,140 ft), the archaeological site consists of five churches north of the town's river Jordan, five south of the river, and one independently located. The churches in each grouping are connected by a system of tunnels and trenches. Biete Giorgis, the eleventh church, is connected to the others by trenches. The northern churches are Biete Medhane Alem, Biete Maryam, Biete Golgotha Mikael, Biete Meskel, and Biete Denagel. The southern churches are Biete Amanuel, Biete Qeddus Mercoreus, Biete Abba Libanos, Biete Lehem, and Biete Gabriel-Rufael.

== Architecture ==
The rock-hewn churches at Lalibela are made through a subtractive processes in which space is created by removing material. Out of the 11 churches, 4 are free-standing (monolithic) and 7 share a wall with the mountain out of which they are carved. The churches are each unique, giving the site an architectural diversity that is evident by the human figures of bas-reliefs inside Bet Golgotha, and the colorful paintings of geometrical designs and biblical scenes in Bet Mariam.

Moldings and string courses divide larger structural shapes into smaller sections in many of the churches.

The construction of the churches are thought to have taken place in three phases.

All 11 churches were the result of a process using the basic tools of hammers and chisels to excavate trenches surrounding the monolithic and semi-monolithic structures, as well as a system of tunnels which connected two separate groups of the churches with each other out of the scoriaceous basalt. The "construction" was done from top to bottom.

== Religious significance and function ==
The Churches of Lalibela hold important religious significance for Ethiopian Orthodox Christians. Together they form a pilgrimage site with particular spiritual and symbolic value, with a layout representing the holy city of Jerusalem. The site continues to be used for daily worship and prayer, the celebration of religious festivals like Timkat and Genna, as a home to clergy, and as a place which increasingly brings together religious adherents and leaders every year.

== Conservation ==
Several recent conservation and restoration projects have been implemented at the site, but have been flawed in execution. A project in which the American Embassy is funding the restoration of Bet Gabriel-Rafael and subsequently Bet Golgotha-Mikael has seen issues emerge between the various parties involved in the project regarding understanding of its full scope. There has been a lack of adequate communication and sharing of information regarding project plans between the Authority for Research and Conservation of Cultural Heritage (ARCCH) and the local committee and church.

With funding from the EU, four shelters were erected in 2008 to cover five of the site's churches in an attempt to provide a temporary mode of protection for the structures until a more long-term solution could be decided upon. However, the shelters have remained in place now for far longer than they were meant to stay standing, and now consequently pose serious dangers to the buildings underneath as they threaten to collapse due to their heavy weight among other factors. The ARCCH Director has indicated that the shelters must be removed, however there are not yet any definitive plans in place for their removal and what will be done afterward.

== List of churches ==
Image	Name	English name	Location	Notes
	Biete Giorgis (ቤተ ጊዮርጊስ)	House of St. George	12°01′54″N 39°02′28″E; Independent	Shaped in a cruciform plan.
	Biete Denagel (ቤተ ደናግል)	House of Virgins	North group	
	Biete Golgotha Mikael (ቤተ ጎልጎታ ሚካኤል)	House of Golgotha Mikael	North group	Has replicas of the tomb of Christ, and of Adam, and the crib of the Nativity.
	Biete Maryam (ቤተ ማርያም)	House of Mary	12.03371°N 39.04333°E; North group	Has a painted ceiling depicting various biblical scenes.
	Biete Medhane Alem (ቤተ መድሃኒ አለም)	House of the Saviour of the World	12.0337°N 39.0437°E; North group	Home to the Lalibela Cross. Believed to be the largest monolithic church in the world.
	Biete Meskel (ቤተ መስቀል)	House of the Cross	12.033941°N 39.0434°E; North group	
	Biete Abba Libanos (ቤተ አባ ሊባኖስ)	House of Abbot Libanos	12.03141°N 39.04518°E; South group	
	Biete Amanuel (ቤተ አማኑኤል)	House of Emmanuel	12.03182°N 39.04556°E; South group	
	Biete Gabriel-Rufael (ቤተ ገብሬል ሩፋኤል)	House of Gabriel Raphael	12.03120°N 39.04464°E; South group	
	Biete Lehem (ቤተ ልሄም)	House of Holy Bread	12.03169°N 39.04451°E; South group	
	Biete Qeddus Mercoreus (ቤተ ማርቆርዮስ)	House of St. Mercoreos	12.03157°N 39.04548°E; South group	
