= Lalibela =

Town in Amhara Region, Ethiopia

Lalibela ላሊበላ
- Town
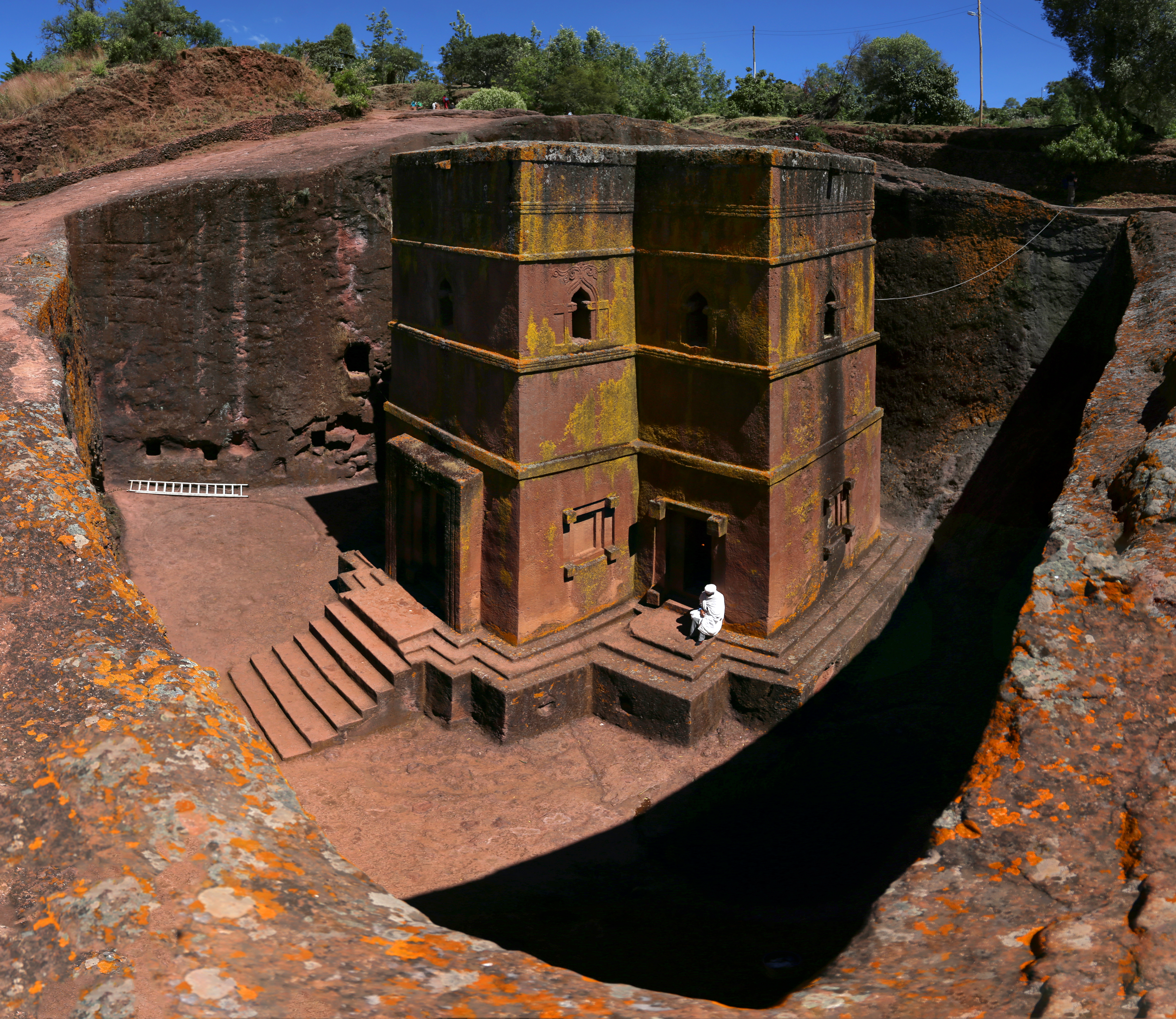
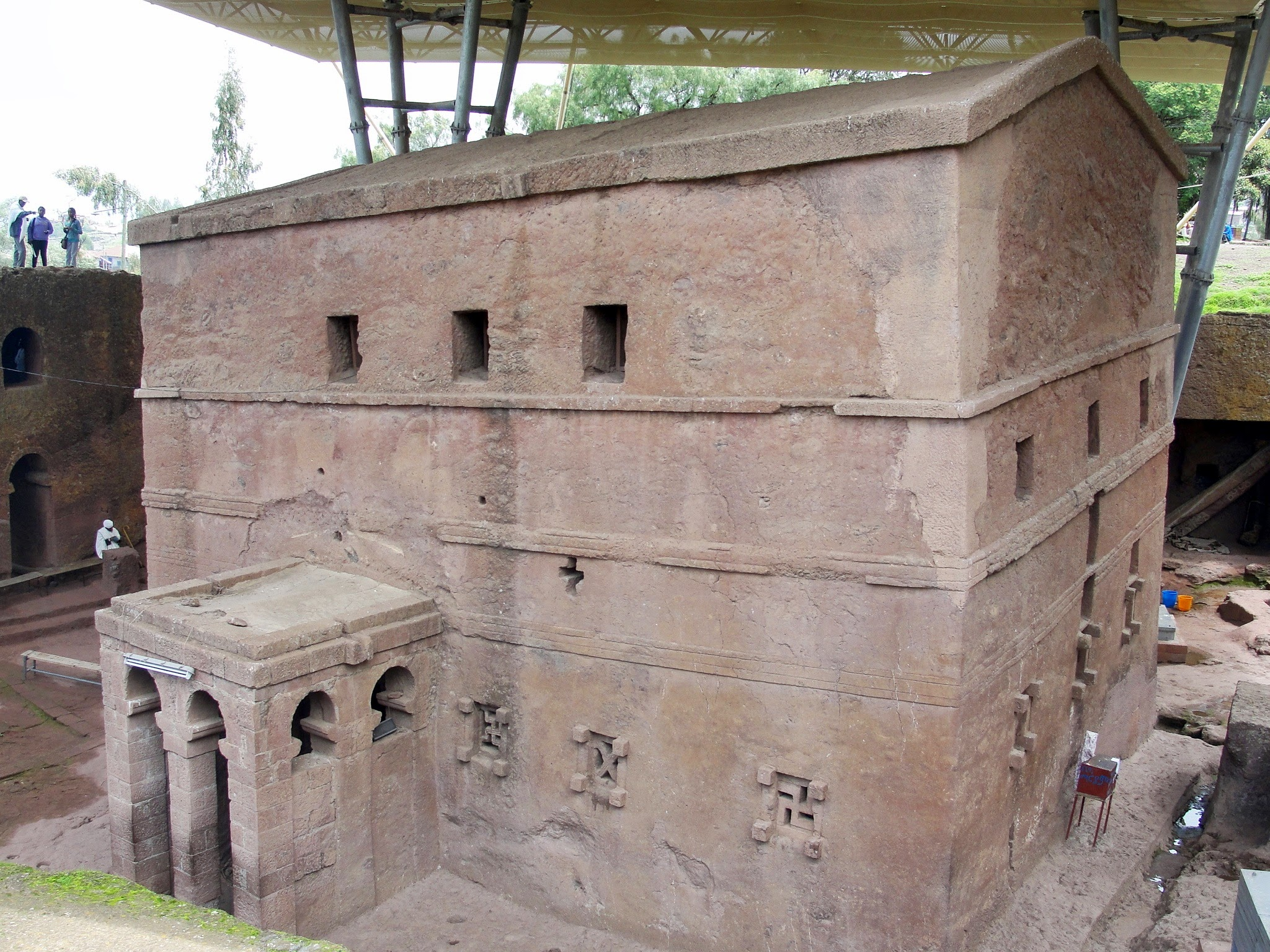
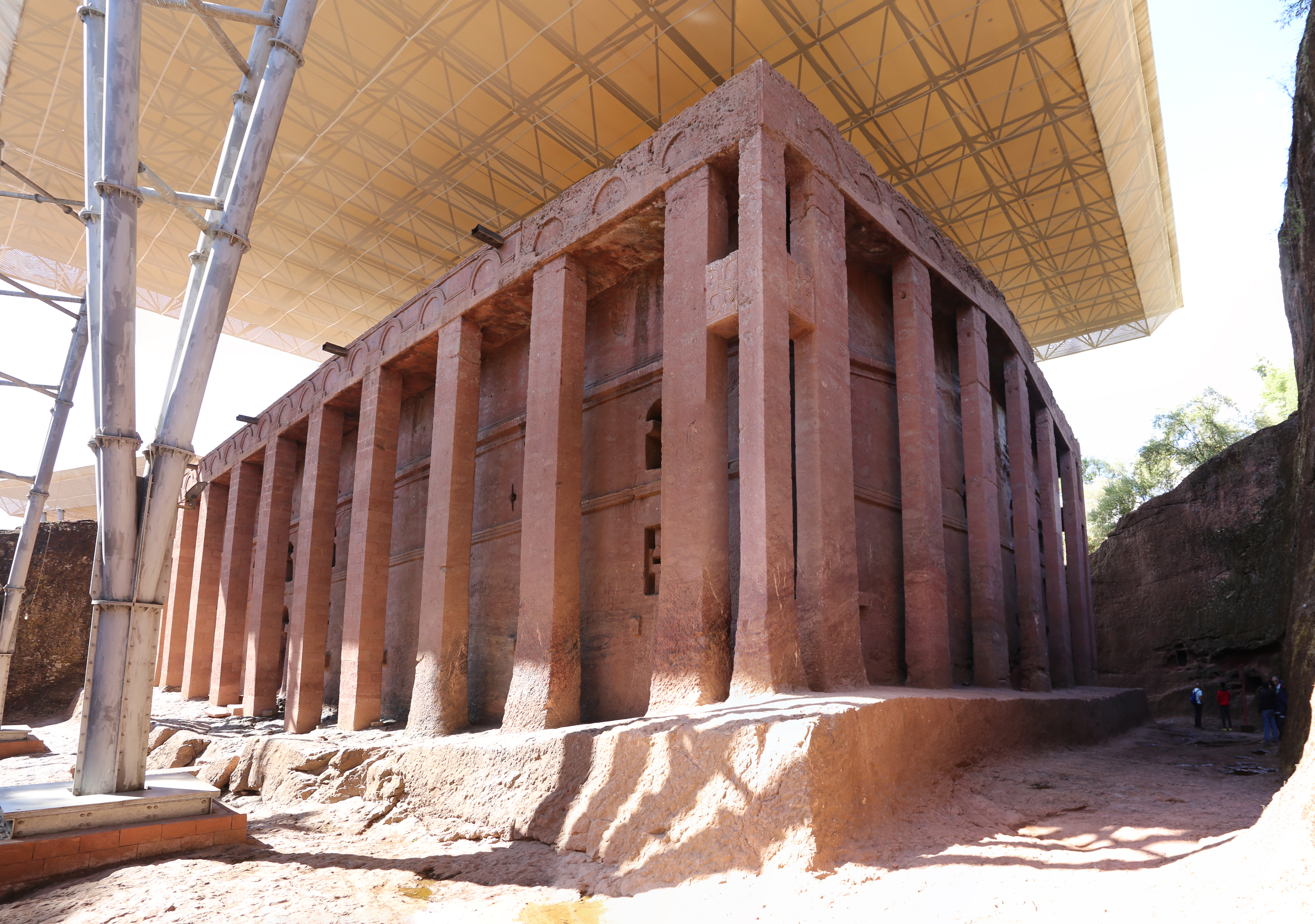
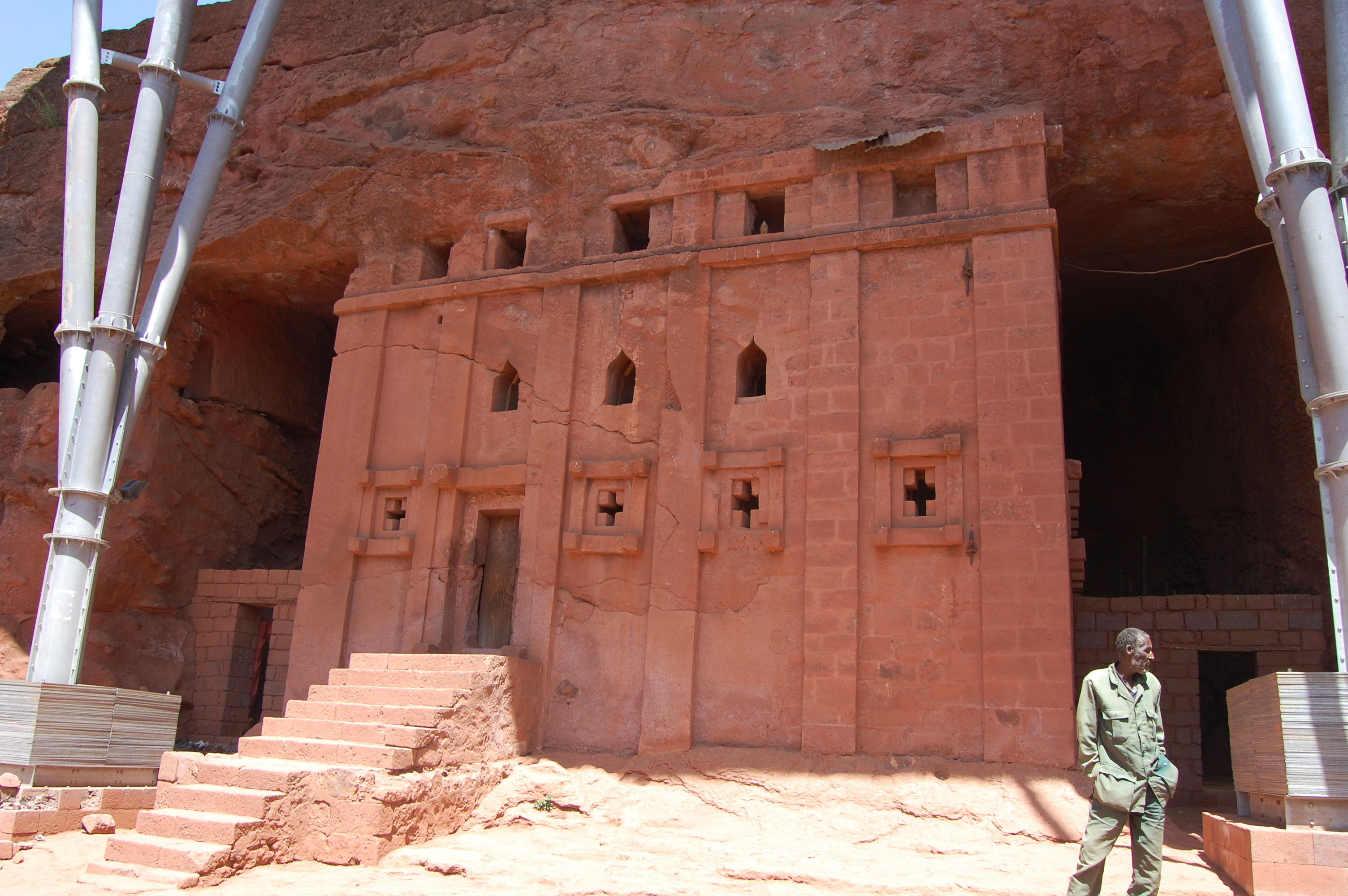
- Rock-Hewn Churches from top left: Church of Saint George; Biete Maryam; Biete Medhane Alem; Biete Abba Libanos

- Location within Ethiopia Location within the Horn of Africa Location within Africa
- Coordinates: 12°01′54″N 39°02′28″E
- Country: Ethiopia
- Region: Amhara
- Zone: North Wollo

Population (2007)
  - Total: 17,367
- Time zone: UTC+3 (EAT)

Lalibela (Amharic: ላሊበላ, romanized: Lalibäla) is a town in the Amhara Region of Ethiopia. Located in the Lasta district and North Wollo Zone, it is a tourist site for its famous rock-cut monolithic churches designed in contrast to the earlier monolithic churches in Ethiopia. The whole of Lalibela is a large and important site for the antiquity, medieval, and post-medieval civilization of Ethiopia. To some Christians, Lalibela is one of Ethiopia's holiest cities, and a center of pilgrimage.

Ethiopia was one of the earliest nations to adopt Christianity in the first half of the 4th century, and its historical roots date to the time of the Apostles. The churches themselves date from the 7th to 13th centuries, and are traditionally dated to the reign of the Zagwe (Agaw) king Gebre Meskel Lalibela (r. c. 1181–1221).

The layout and names of the major buildings in Lalibela are widely accepted, especially by local clergy, to be a symbolic representation of Jerusalem. This has led some experts to date the current church construction to the years following the capture of Jerusalem in 1187 by the Muslim leader Saladin.

Lalibela is roughly 2,500 metres (8,200 ft) above sea level. It is the main town in Lasta, which was formerly part of the Bugna district. The rock-hewn churches were declared a World Heritage Site in 1978.

The best time to visit the city is during the dry season from October to March, when weather conditions are most favorable for exploring the temple complex. During this period, the city is especially crowded during major religious festivals, particularly Genna (January 7) and Timkat (January 19), when religious services are accompanied by multi-day processions, traditional music, and rituals.

== History ==
=== Origins ===
There is some controversy as to when some of the churches were constructed. According to local tradition, in Ethiopia prior to his accession to the throne, Gebre Meskel Lalibela was guided by Jesus on a tour of Jerusalem, and instructed to build a second Jerusalem in Ethiopia. Accordingly, Lalibela, traditionally known as Roha, was founded during the Zagwe dynasty under the rule of King Gebre Meskel Lalibela (r. ca. 1181–1221), although it is more likely that the churches evolved into their current form over the course of several phases of construction and alteration of preexisting structures.

David Roden Buxton established the generally accepted chronology, noting that "two of them follow, with great fidelity of detail, the tradition represented by Debra Damo as modified at Yemrahana Kristos." Since the time spent to carve these structures from the living rock must have taken longer than the few decades of reign of Gebre Meskel Lalibela, Buxton assumes that the work extended into the 14th century.

However, David Phillipson, professor of African archeology at University of Cambridge, has proposed that the churches of Merkorios, Gabriel-Rufael, and Danagel were initially carved out of the rock half a millennium earlier, as fortifications or other palace structures between 600 and 800, during the days of the Kingdom of Aksum, and that King Lalibela's name simply came to be associated with them after his death. On the other hand, local historian Getachew Mekonnen credits Queen Meskel Kibra, Lalibela's wife, with having one of the rock-hewn churches, Biete Abba Libanos, built as a memorial for her husband after his death.

Recent archaeological excavations at Lalibela have yielded abundant pottery and faunal remains dating to 900–1100, indicating that the site was largely a secular settlement before being transformed into a religious center by King Lalibela. Prechristian carved animal friezes were also found on the lower walls of the nearby Washa Mikael cave, and Christian paintings were subsequently added to the upper walls, suggesting that this region was still undergoing Christianization at this time.

=== 15th century ===
Its name was first used in a European publication in Fra Mauro map made in Venice 1457–59, written as Lalabeda.

=== 16th century ===
A Portuguese priest, Francisco Álvares (1465–1540), accompanied the Portuguese ambassador on a visit to Dawit II in the 1520s. After Alvares described the unique church structures he wrote: "I weary of writing more about these buildings, because it seems to me that I shall not be believed if I write more because as to what I have already written they may accuse me of untruth, therefore I swear by God, in whose power I am, that all that is written is the truth, and there is much more than what I have written, and I have left it that they may not tax me with its being falsehood. And because no other Portuguese went to these works except myself, and I went twice to see them from what I had heard of them. I swear by God, in Whose power I am, that all I have written is the truth". Although Ramuso included the plans of several of these churches in his 1550 printing of Álvares' book, it is unknown who provided him with the drawings.

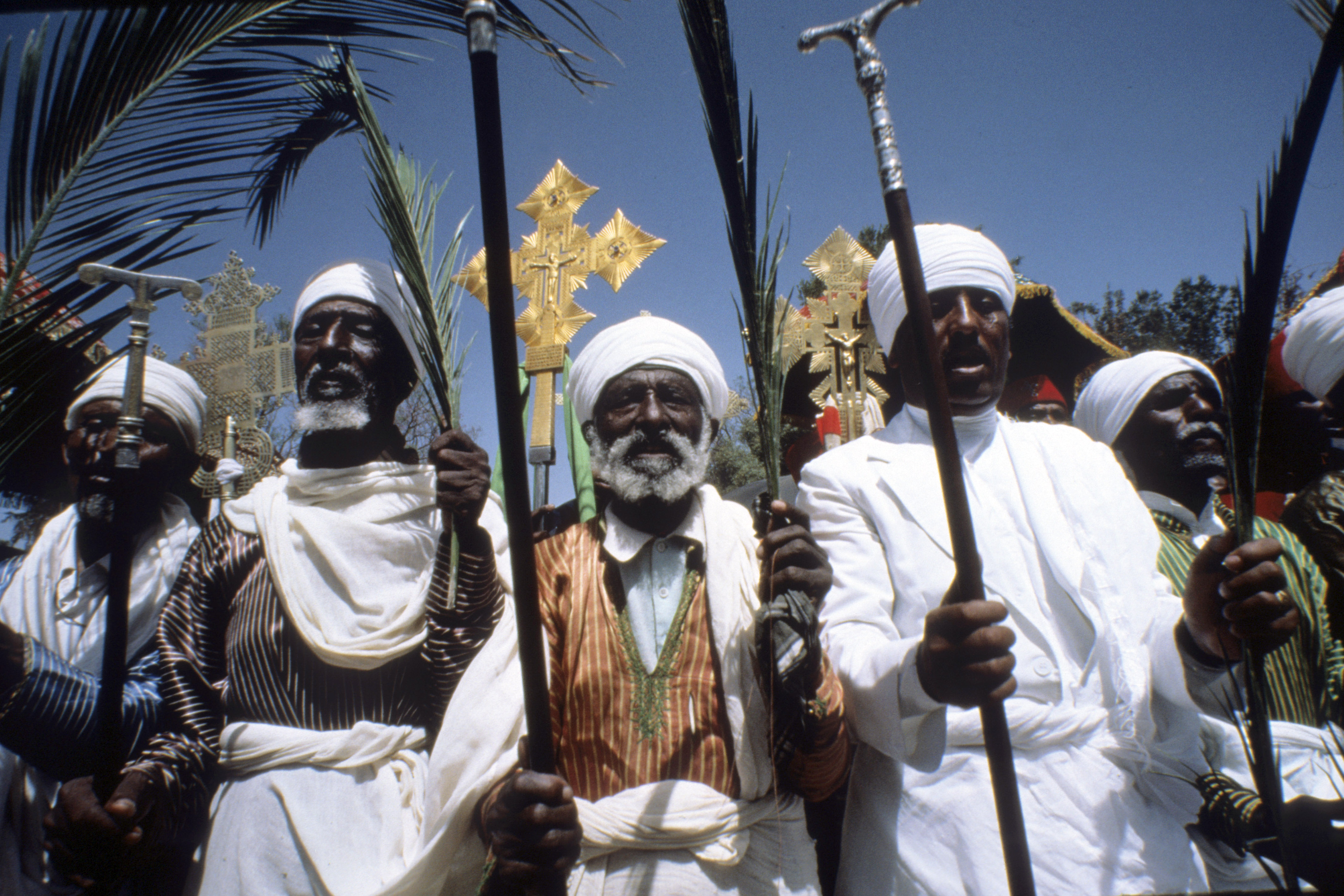
Ethiopian Orthodox priests holding a procession in Lalibela

According to the Futuh al-Habasha of Shihab al-Dīn Aḥmad ibn ʿAbd al-Qādir ibn Sālim ibn ʿUthmān, Ahmad ibn Ibrahim al-Ghazi burned one of the churches of Lalibela during his invasion of Ethiopia. Sihab ad-Din Ahmad (Arab Faqih) provided a detailed description of a rock-hewn church. "It was carved out of the mountain. Its pillars were likewise cut from the mountain." Ahmed then gathered the monks of Lalibela and had a fire lit in the church, saying to them, "Let one of yours and one of ours enter there". A nun then threw herself onto the fire before being pulled out by Ahmad's soldiers.

However, Richard Pankhurst has expressed skepticism about this, noting that the Royal Chronicles, which record Ahmad al-Ghazi's laying waste to the district between July and September 1531, are silent on his ravaging of the churches. He concludes by stating that had Ahmad al-Ghazi burned a church at Lalibela, it was most likely Biete Medhane Alem; and if the Adalites was either mistaken or misled by the locals, then the church he set fire to was Gannata Maryam, "10 miles [16 km] east of Lalibela which likewise has a colonnade of pillars cut from the mountain."

The next reported visitor to Lalibela was Miguel de Castanhoso, a soldier under Cristóvão da Gama who left Ethiopia in 1544. Castanhoso states,

There are here certain churches cut out of the living rock, which are attributed to angels. Indeed, the work appears superhuman, because, though they are of the size of the large ones in this country, they are each excavated with its pillars, its altars, and its vaults, out of a single rock, with no mixture of any outside stone. When the Moors overran this country they wished to destroy these churches, but could not either with crowbars, or with the gunpowder which they exploded in them, doing no damage at all.

=== 19th century ===
In 1882, French explorer Achille Raffray was given an Ethiopian manuscript at Lalibela, which adds that King Lalibela and his wife Meskal Kebra brought from Alexandria and Jerusalem about five hundred workers still referred to as Europeans, headed by someone named Sidi Meskal. However, according to Monti della Corte (1940) Raffray's translation of the three-language manuscript was almost completely incorrect. Utilizing the expertise of Arnold Van Lantschoot at the Vatican Library, the discrepancies were clarified. The first text, written in Coptic (contrary to Raffray's assertion of Medieval Greek), is a brief statement attributed to Abuna Bartolomeo, dated during the reign of Dawit I (1380–1409). The second text, in Arabic, serves as a land charter confirming specific rights of the church. The third text, in Geʽez, appears to have been written during the reign of Dawit II (1508–1540). Contrary to Raffray's claims, the texts make no mention of Sidi Maskal or foreign builders.

=== 20th century ===
During the Second Italo-Ethiopian War, Haile Selassie made a pilgrimage to the churches at Lalibela, at considerable risk of capture, before returning to his capital in April 1936. Italian forces captured the town shortly after.

In 1968, Mohammad Reza Pahlavi accompanied by Emperor Haile Selassie visited the churches, the next year Queen Juliana and Prince Bernhard would also visit Lalibela.

During the Ethiopian Civil War, the town was the target of frequent attacks by the Ethiopian People's Democratic Movement (EPDM), in 1984 they briefly held ten foreigners captive. On March 3, 1985, they briefly captured the crew of a French transport aircraft carrying supplies before releasing them a couple days later. These attacks significantly reduced foreign tourism to Lalibela, and by 1990 most of the tourists were Ethiopians.

=== 21st century ===
The eleven Rock-Hewn churches of Lalibela are monolithic churches. The site remains in use by the Ethiopian Orthodox Christian Church to this day. It took 24 years to build all the 11 rock hewn churches.

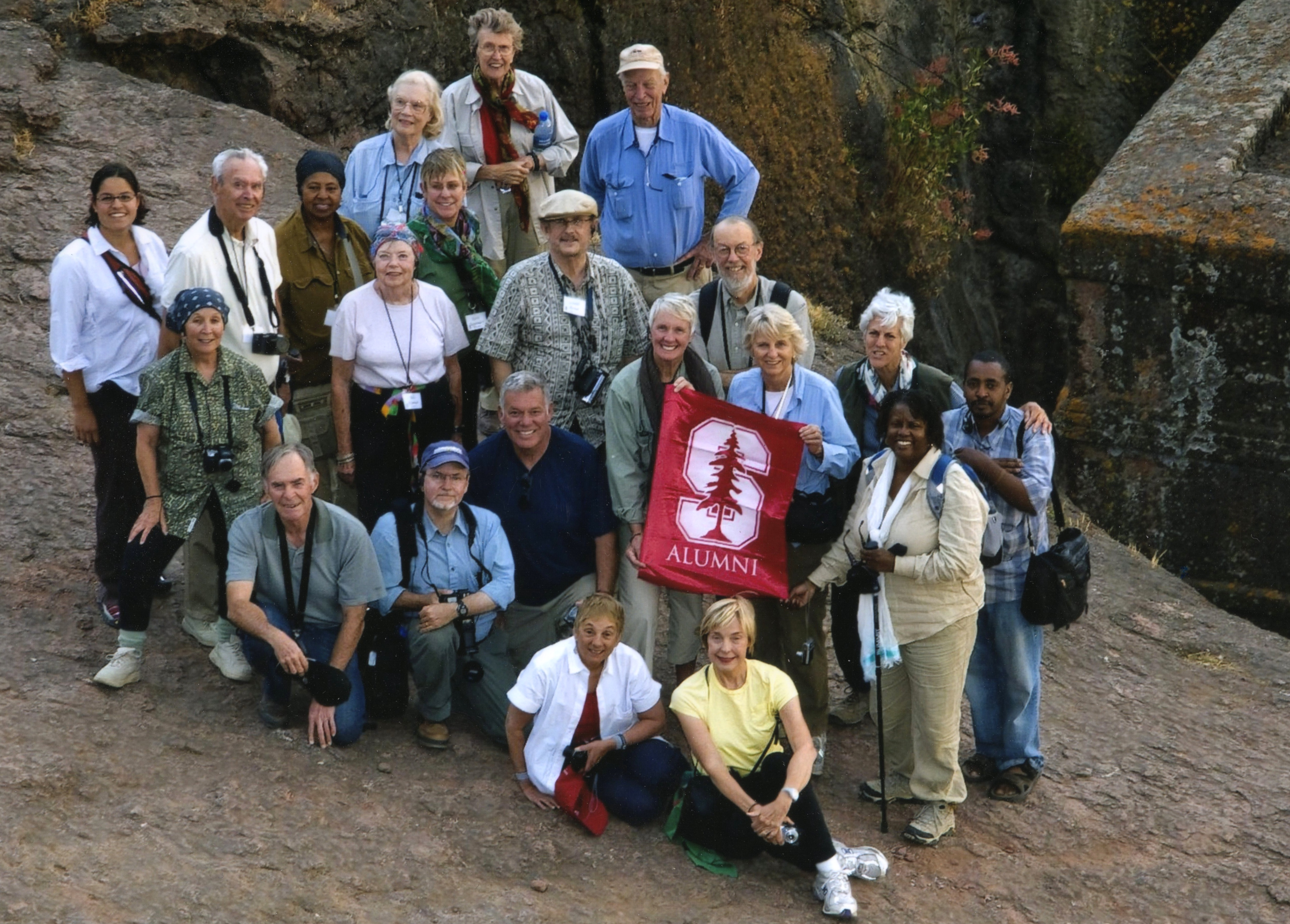
Travelers in Lalibela, Ethiopia

In early August 2021, Tigrayan Defense Force fighters captured the town during the Tigray War as a response to the invasion of Amhara forces into the Tigray region. On 1 December 2021, the Ethiopian army recaptured the town. The town was recaptured again by Tigrayan forces on 12 December. On 19 December, Ethiopian state media announced the town was recaptured for a second time, though it was unclear when.

In early November 2023, Lalibela was the site of fierce fighting between the Ethiopian National Defense Force (ENDF) and Fano fighters. The town is currently under Ethiopian government control.

== Architecture ==
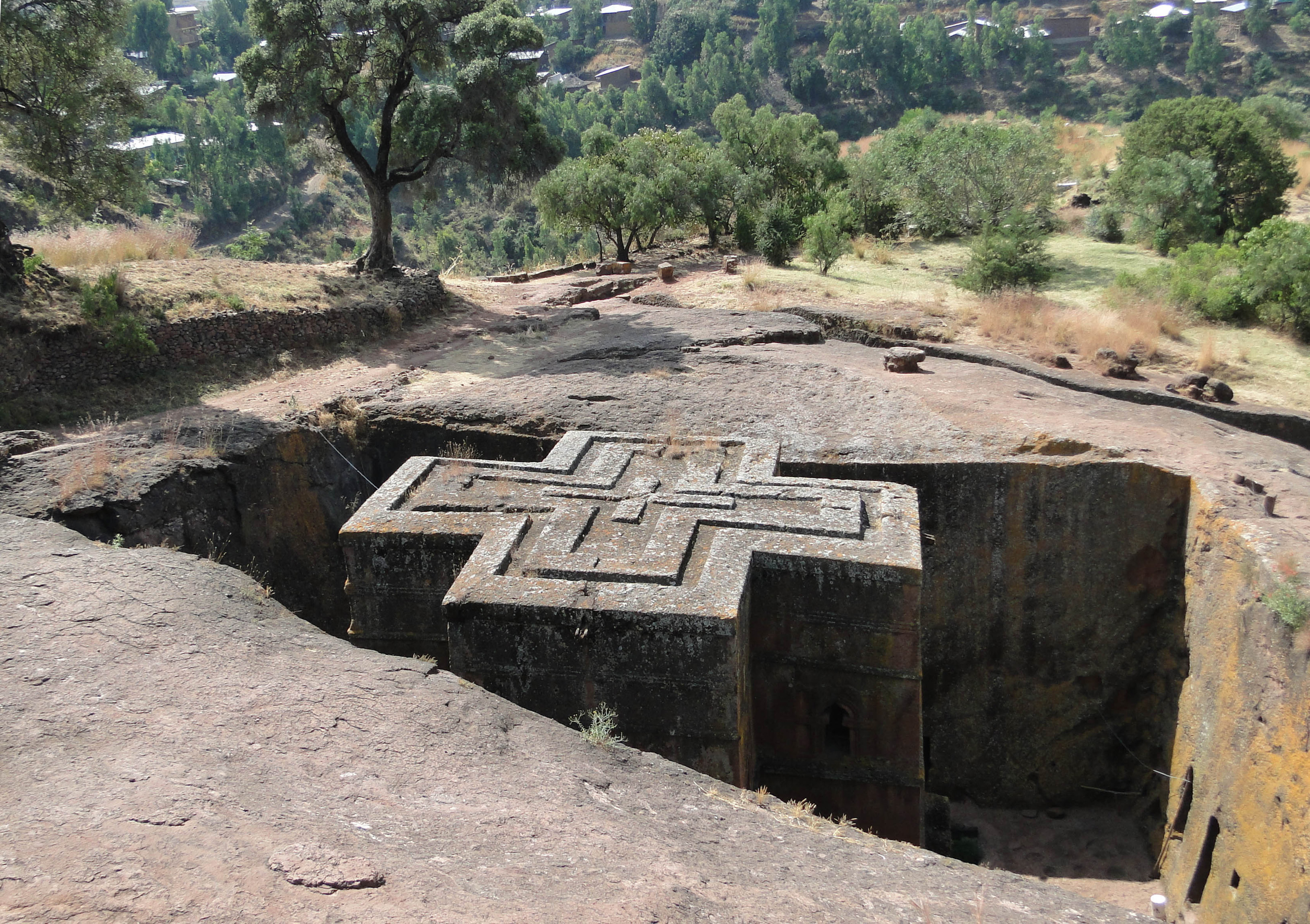
Church of Saint George hewn into the rocky hills of Lalibela

The architecture of the churches contain significant Aksumite influences, as Stuart Munro-Hay notes that the church of Biete Amanuel displays a stone imitation of wooden architectural features, which can still be seen in some of the ancient churches of Tigray and Eritrea. The framed doors and windows appear as a repeated motif, since they seem to mimic the shape of stelae in Aksum, examples can be seen in the arcading of Biete Gabriel-Rufael, the doorway of Biete Maryam and the windows of Biete Amanuel. However, according to David Phillipson the presence of Aksumite style architecture does not necessarily imply that the churches were constructed during the Aksumite era, as Aksumite features could have been incorporated long after the fall of Aksum, but it does indicate a strong continuity with Aksumite cultural tradition. There is also signs of eastern Christian influences, particularly Syrian and Coptic. The pitched roof and linear moldings of Biete Maryam suggests a Syrian influence. Stuart Munro-Hay notes that during the reign of Gebre Meskel Lalibela, many Coptic Egyptians emigrated to Ethiopia and may have assisted in construction of the churches, or at least those that date to his reign. Many foreign travelers such as Manuel de Almeida and Hiob Ludolf credited most of the monuments to Egyptian architects, with Francisco Álvares finding that many locals considered the churches to be mainly the work of foreigners. However, Stuart Munro-Hay argues that since the architecture of the churches were built in the Aksumite style, the foreign influence seems to have largely been limited to "decorative techniques". David Buxton further attests to this by pointing out that "there are clearly signs of Coptic influence in some decorative details", however he is adamant about the native origins of these churches: "But the significant fact is remains that the rock-churches continue to follow the style of the local built-up prototypes, which themselves retain clear evidence of their basically Axumite origin."

In a 1970 report of the historic dwellings of Lalibela, Sandro Angelini evaluated the vernacular earthen architecture on the Lalibela World Heritage Site, including the characteristics of the traditional earth houses and analysis of their state of conservation. His report described two types of vernacular housing found in the area. One type are a group he calls the "tukuls", round huts built of stone and usually having two stories. The second are the single-story "chika" buildings which are round and built of earth and wattle, which he feels reflects more "scarcity". Angel's report also included an inventory of Lalibela's traditional buildings, placing them in categories rating their state of conservation.

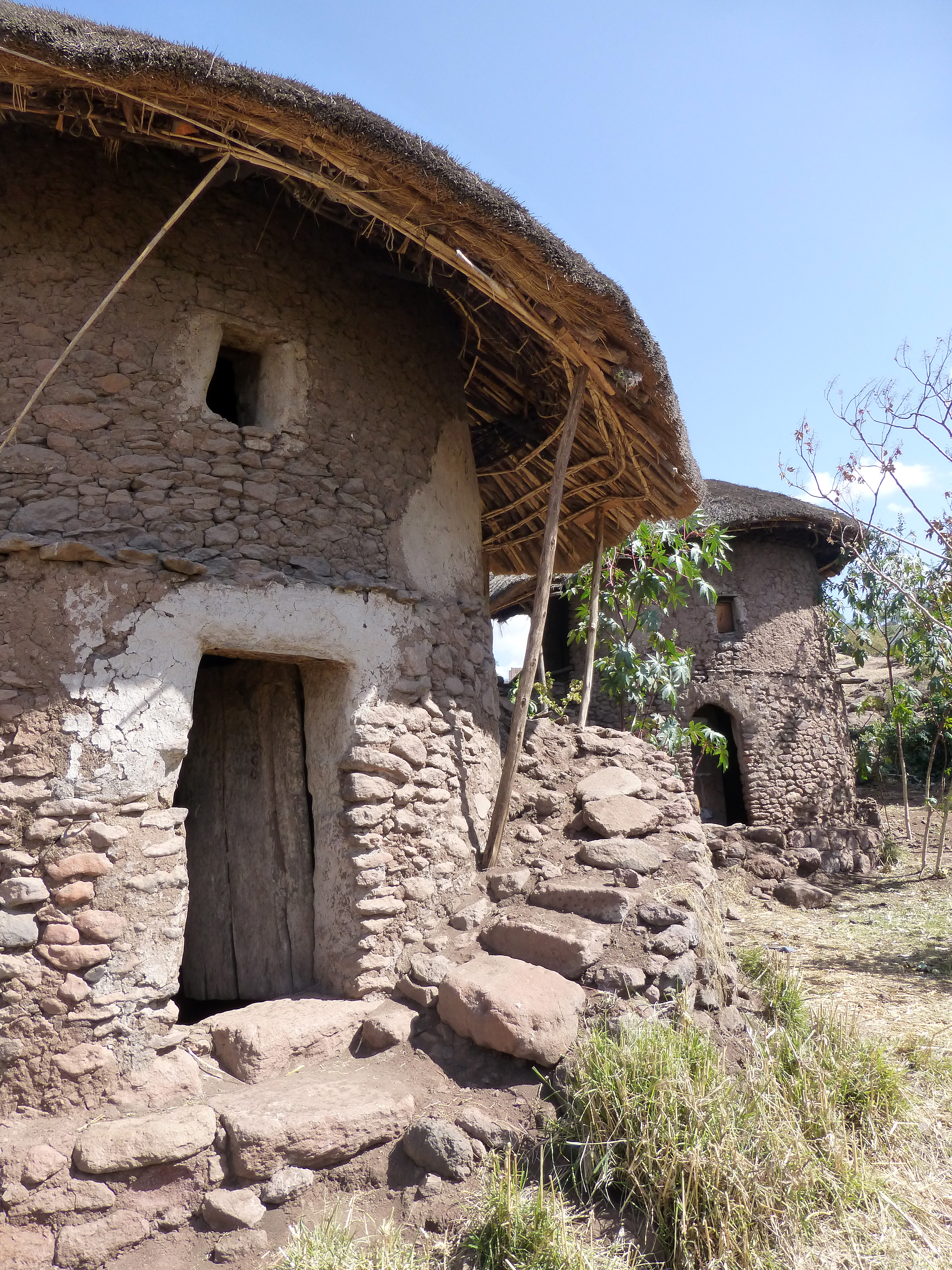
Tukul, two-story stone building

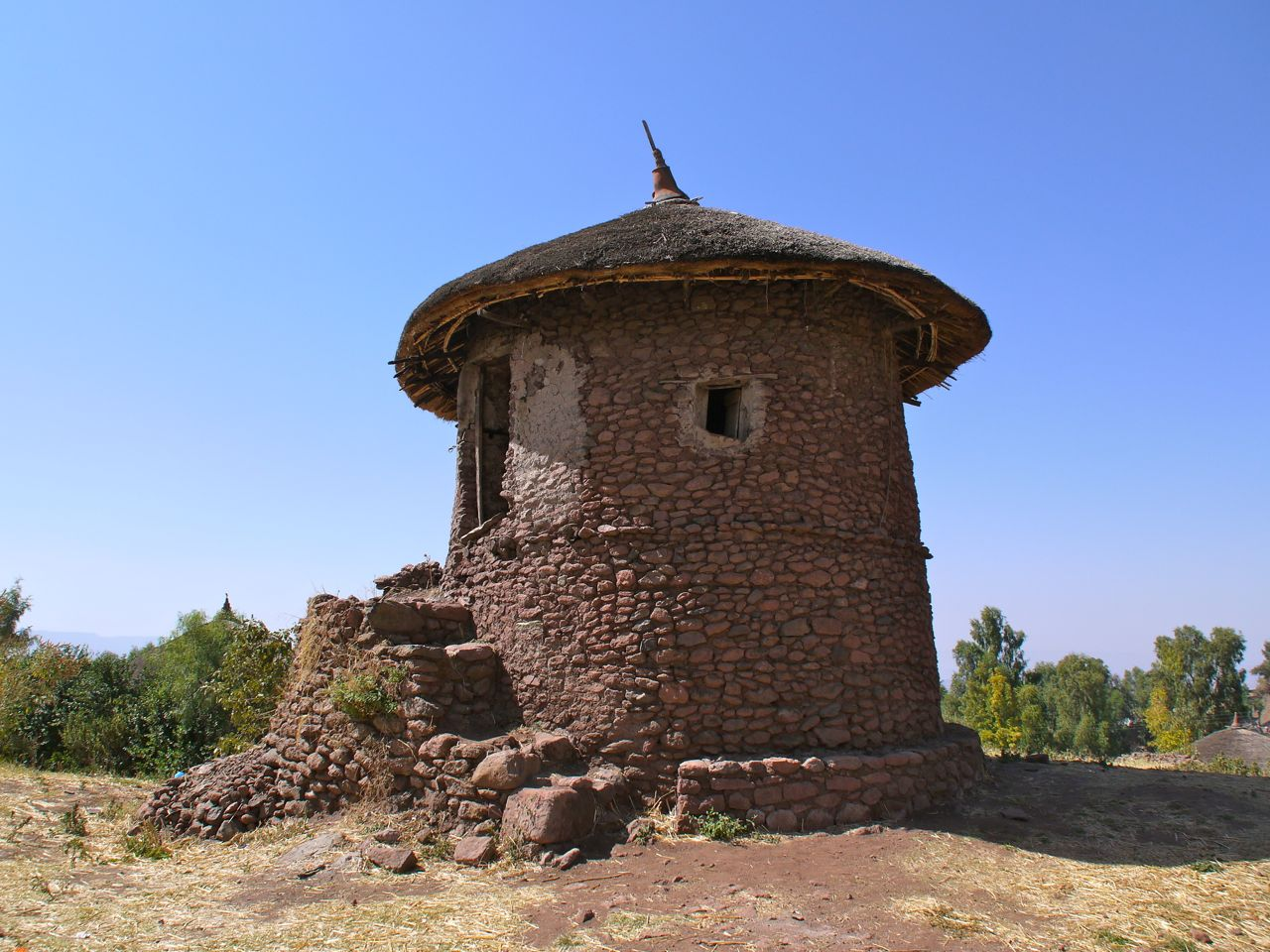
Tukul showing exterior steps to second floor

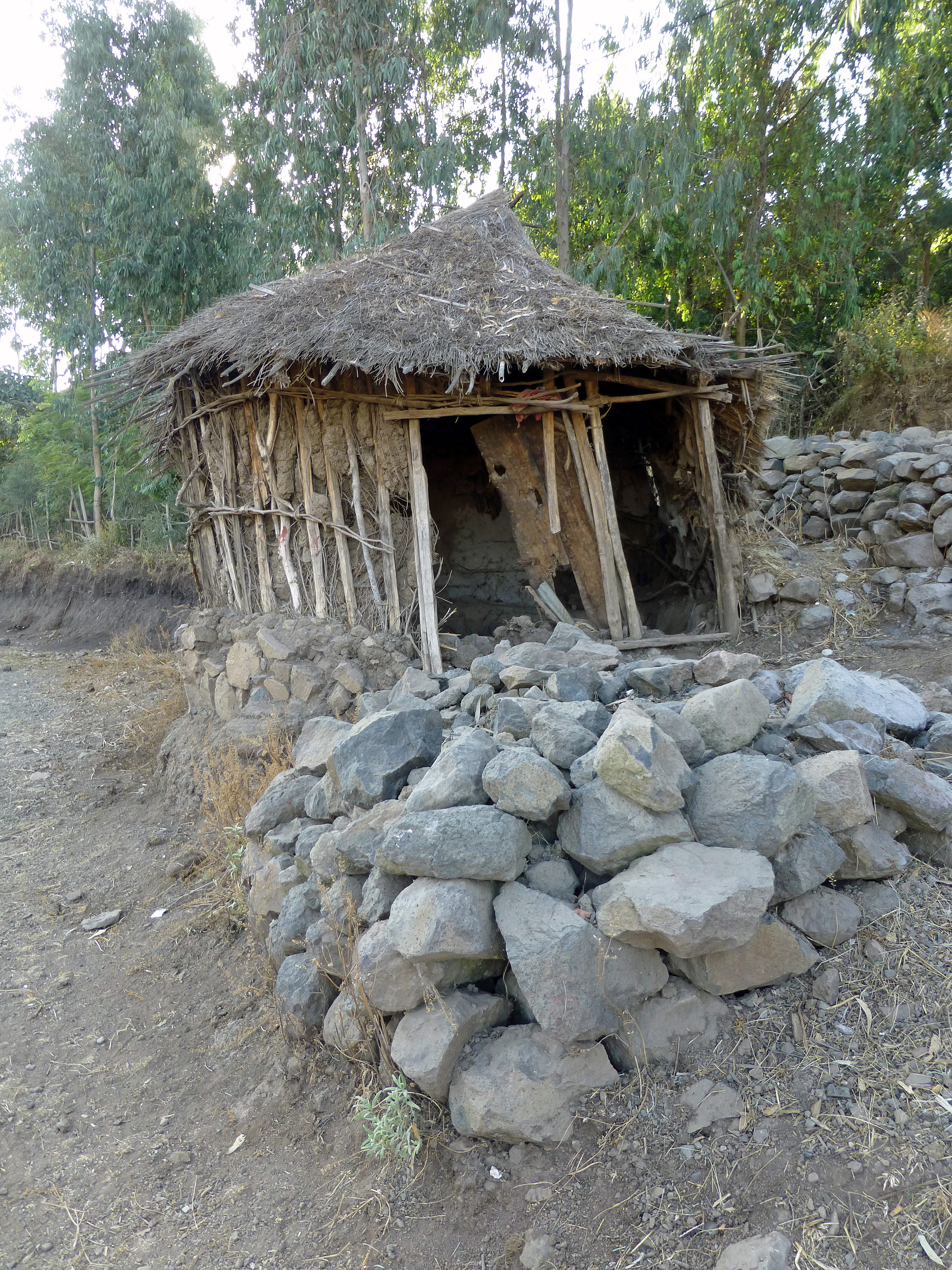
Chika, an earth and wattle building

== Churches ==
Rock-Hewn Churches, Lalibela
UNESCO World Heritage Site
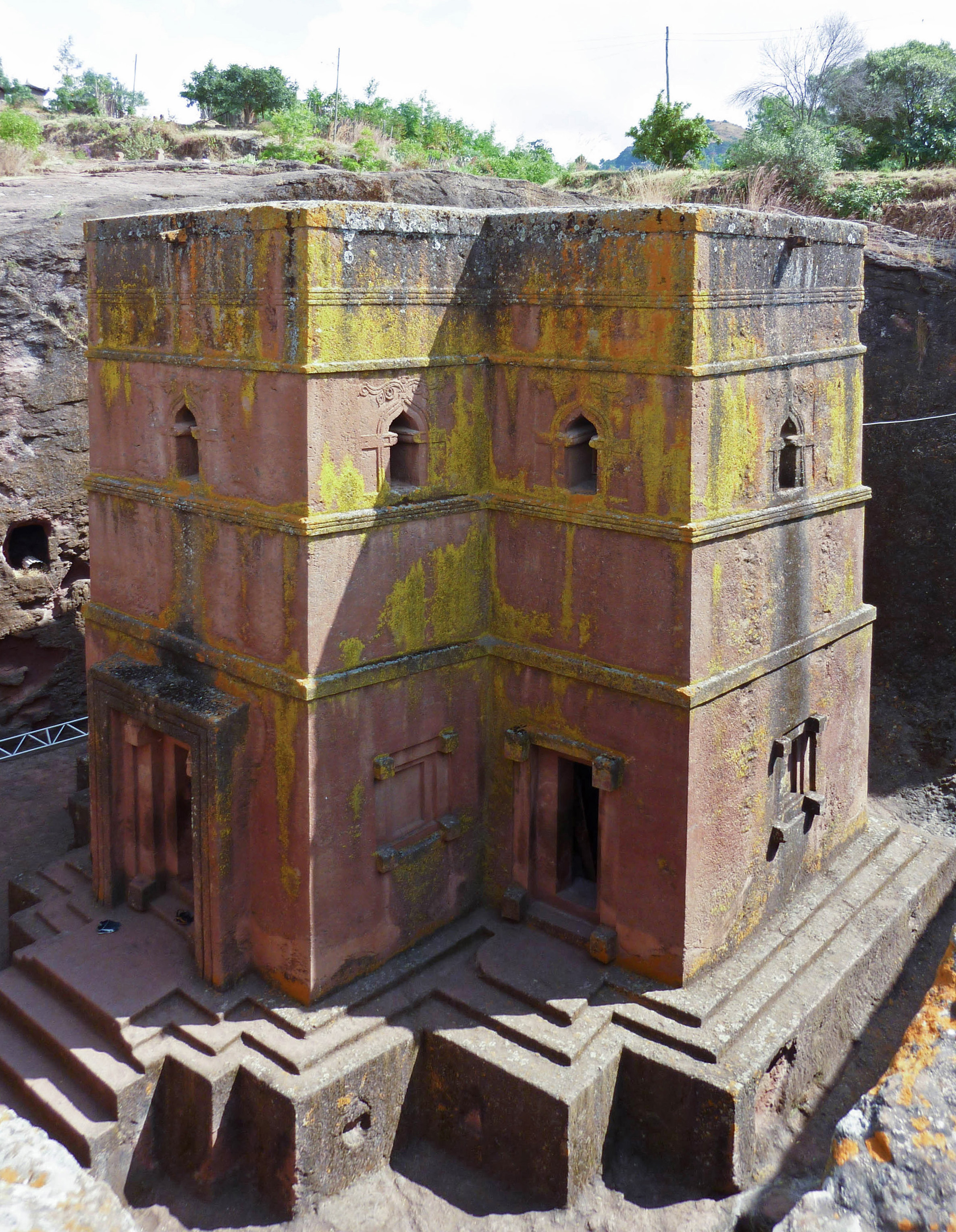
- The Church of Saint George, showing its base and walls
- Interactive map of Rock-Hewn Churches, Lalibela
- Criteria: Cultural: i, ii, iii
- Reference: 18
- Inscription: 1978 (2nd Session)

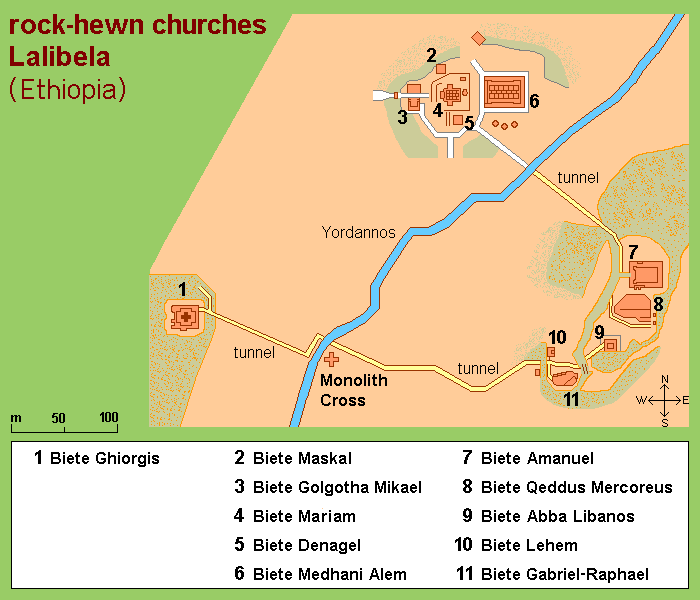
Lalibela area map

This rural town is known around the world for its churches carved from within the earth from "living rock," which play an important part in the history of rock-cut architecture. Though the dating of the churches is not well established, most are thought to have been built during the reign of Lalibela, namely during the 12th and 13th centuries. Unesco identifies 11 churches, assembled in four groups:

The Northern Group:

- Biete Medhane Alem (House of the Saviour of the World), home to the Lalibela Cross.
- Biete Maryam (House of Miriam/House of Mary), possibly the oldest of the churches, and a replica of the Tombs of Adam and Christ.
- Biete Golgotha Mikael (House of Golgotha Mikael), known for its arts and said to contain the tomb of King Lalibela)
- Biete Meskel (House of the Cross)
- Biete Denagel (House of Virgins)

The Western Group:

- Church of Saint George, thought to be the most finely executed and best preserved church

The Eastern Group:

- Biete Amanuel (House of Immanuel), possibly the former royal chapel.
- Biete Qeddus Mercoreus (House of Saint Mercurius/House of Mark the Evangelist), which may be a former prison
- Biete Abba Libanos (House of Abbot Libanos)
- Biete Gabriel-Rufael (House of the angels Gabriel, and Raphael) possibly a former royal palace, linked to a holy bakery.
- Biete Lehem ("Bethlehem", Hebrew: בֵּית לֶחֶם "House of Bread").

Farther afield, lie the monastery of Ashetan Maryam and Yemrehana Krestos Church (possibly eleventh century, built in the Aksumite fashion, but within a cave).

The churches are also a significant engineering feat, given that they are all associated with water (which fills the wells next to many of the churches), exploiting an artesian geological system that brings the water up to the top of the mountain ridge on which the city rests.

== Other features ==
Lalibela is also home to an airport (ICAO code HALL, IATA LLI), a large market, two schools, and a hospital.

== Demographics ==
According to the 2007 Census Data, the population was 17,367, of whom 8,112 were males and 9,255 were females. Based on previous figures from the Central Statistical Agency in 2005, the town had an estimated total population of 14,668 of whom 7,049 were males and 7,619 were females. The 1994 national census recorded its population to be 8,484 of whom 3,709 were males and 4,775 were females.

== Climate ==
Climate data for Lalibela
Month	Jan	Feb	Mar	Apr	May	Jun	Jul	Aug	Sep	Oct	Nov	Dec	Year
Record high °C (°F)	27.6 (81.7)	30.0 (86.0)	30.0 (86.0)	30.5 (86.9)	31.0 (87.8)	28.9 (84.0)	26.6 (79.9)	26.2 (79.2)	26.6 (79.9)	28.6 (83.5)	26.7 (80.1)	26.8 (80.2)	31.0 (87.8)
Mean daily maximum °C (°F)	23.3 (73.9)	24.3 (75.7)	24.8 (76.6)	24.2 (75.6)	24.4 (75.9)	22.8 (73.0)	20.6 (69.1)	20.6 (69.1)	21.3 (70.3)	22.3 (72.1)	22.6 (72.7)	22.8 (73.0)	22.8 (73.1)
Mean daily minimum °C (°F)	9.0 (48.2)	10.3 (50.5)	11.6 (52.9)	12.0 (53.6)	12.3 (54.1)	11.2 (52.2)	11.3 (52.3)	11.2 (52.2)	11.0 (51.8)	9.9 (49.8)	8.7 (47.7)	8.1 (46.6)	10.6 (51.0)
Record low °C (°F)	2.7 (36.9)	3.8 (38.8)	5.0 (41.0)	8.4 (47.1)	8.6 (47.5)	8.6 (47.5)	7.9 (46.2)	8.5 (47.3)	7.0 (44.6)	5.0 (41.0)	2.0 (35.6)	2.3 (36.1)	2.0 (35.6)
Average precipitation mm (inches)	17.0 (0.67)	36.0 (1.42)	68.0 (2.68)	89.0 (3.50)	76.0 (2.99)	124.0 (4.88)	259.0 (10.20)	278.0 (10.94)	174.0 (6.85)	41.0 (1.61)	8.0 (0.31)	10.0 (0.39)	1,180 (46.44)
Source: National Meteorology Agency

== Gallery ==
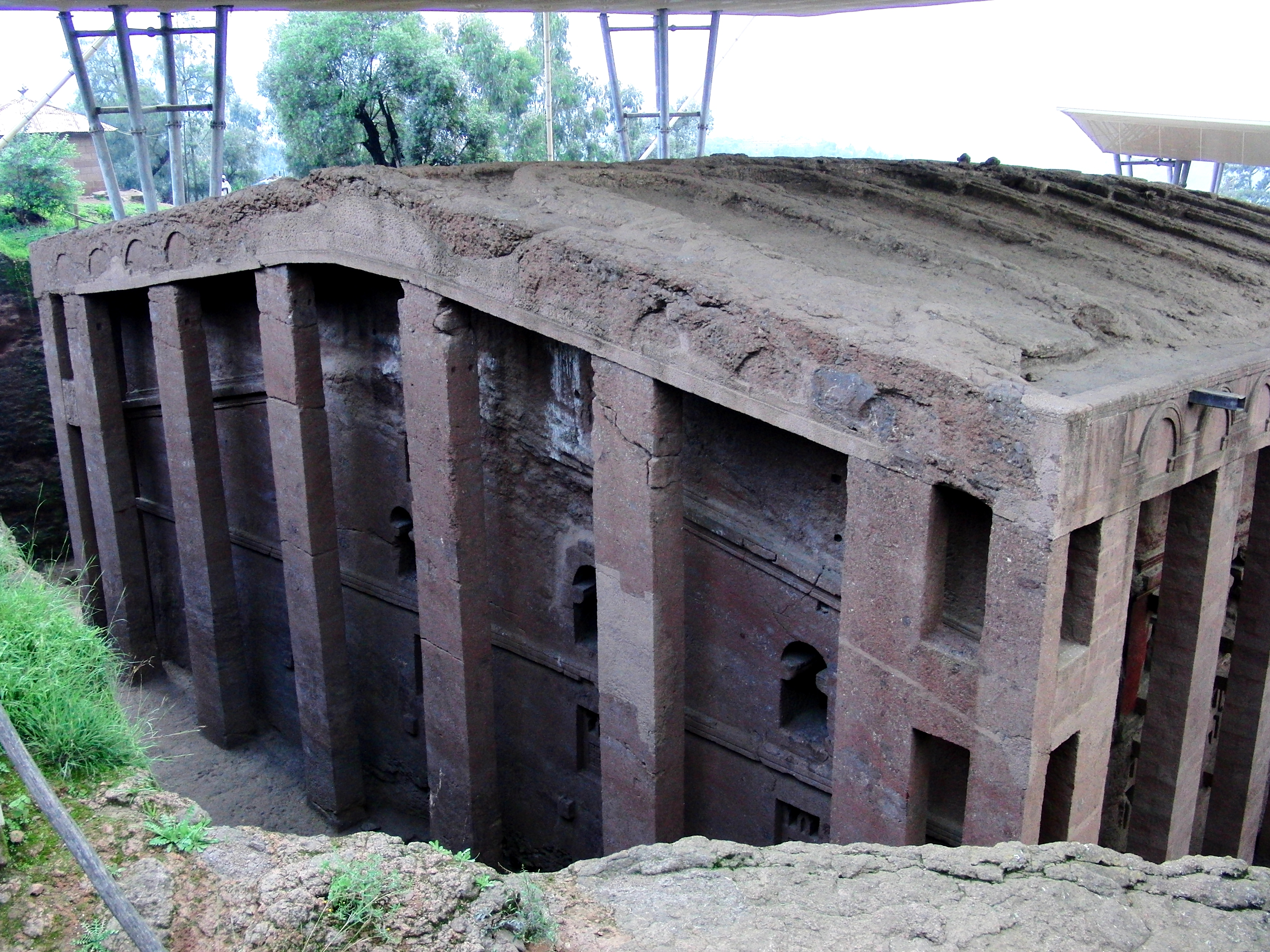
Bete Medhane Alem

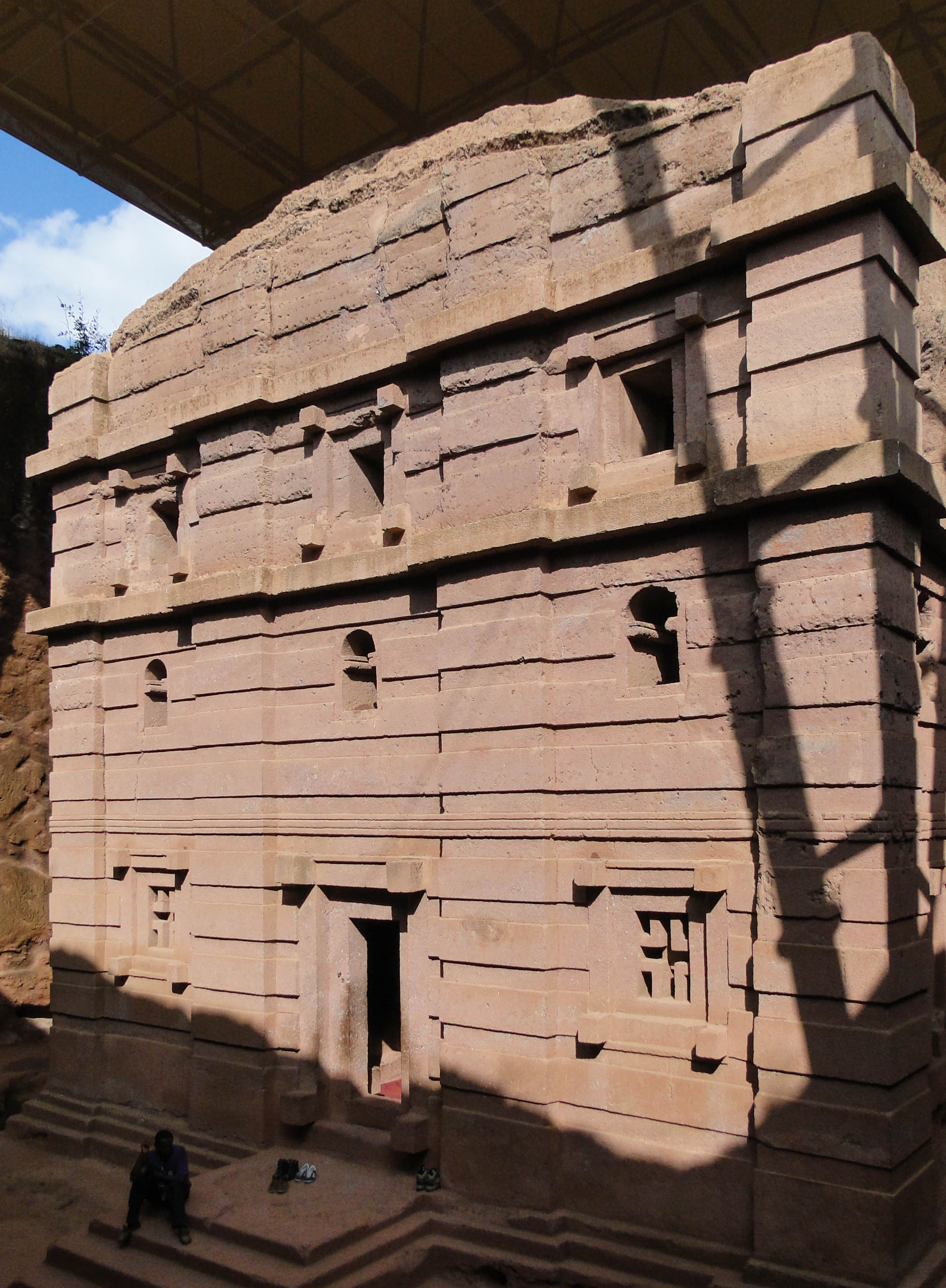
Bete Amanuel

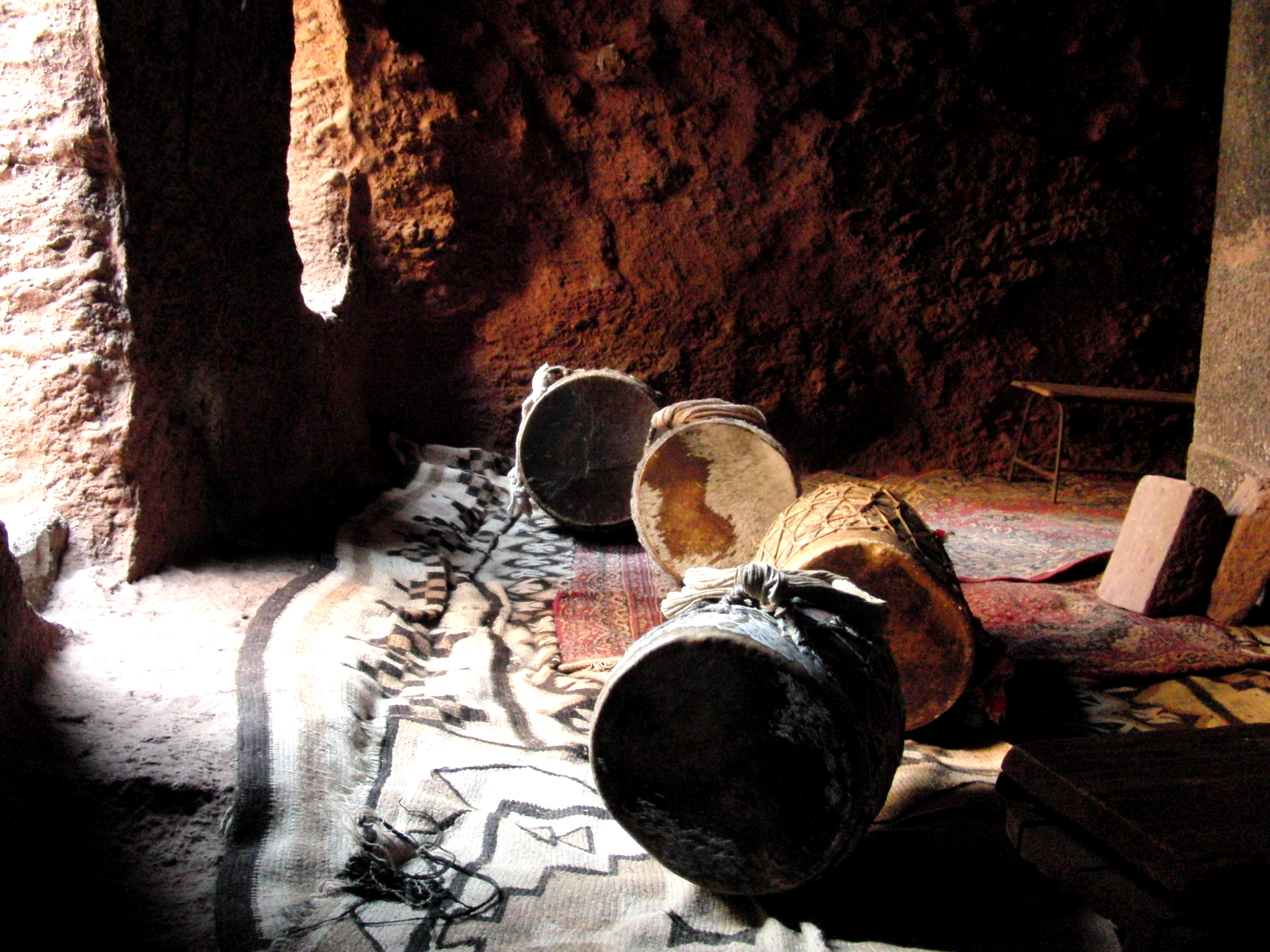
Ritual drums in a side track of Bete Giyorgis

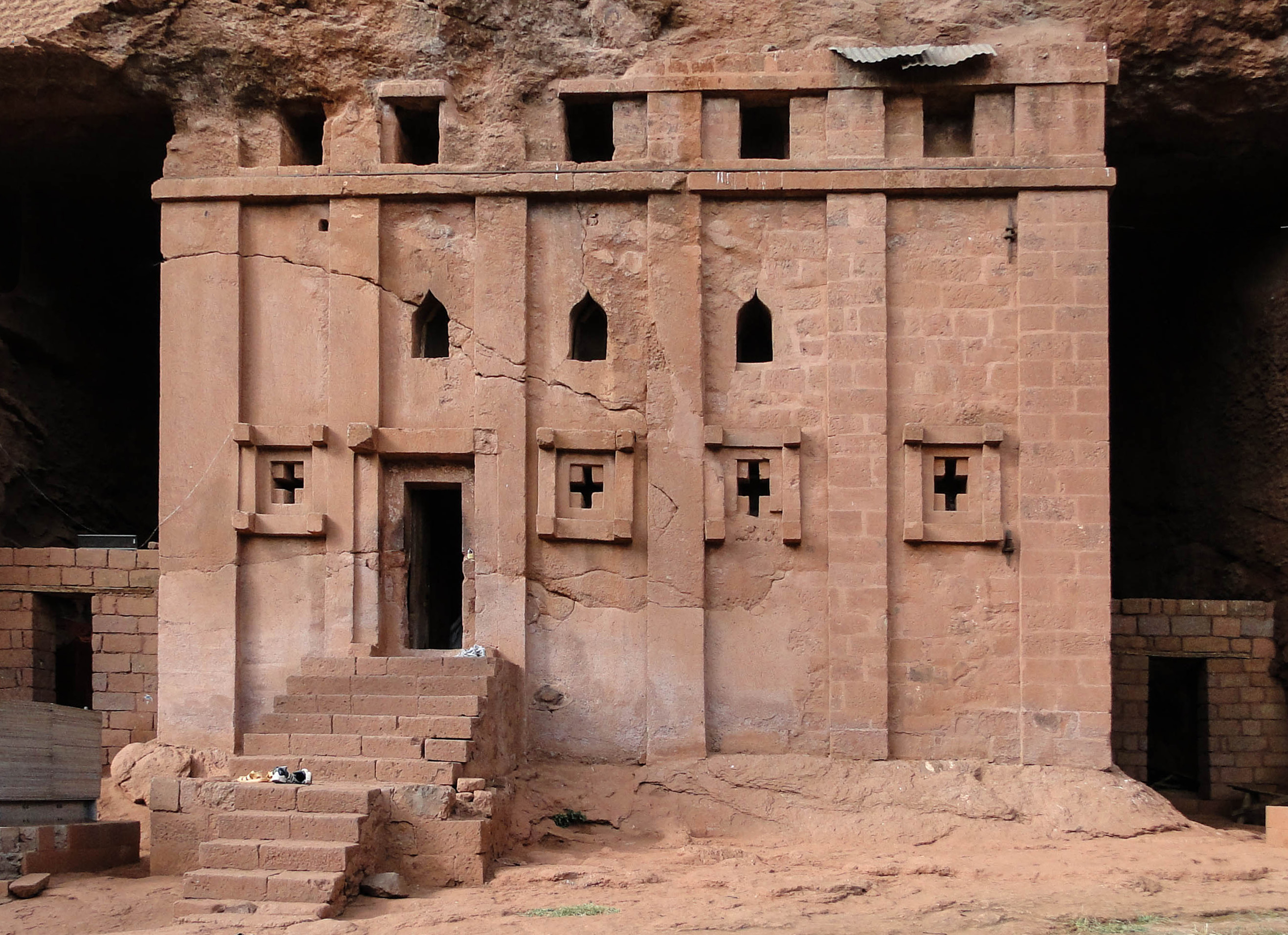
Bete Abba Libanos

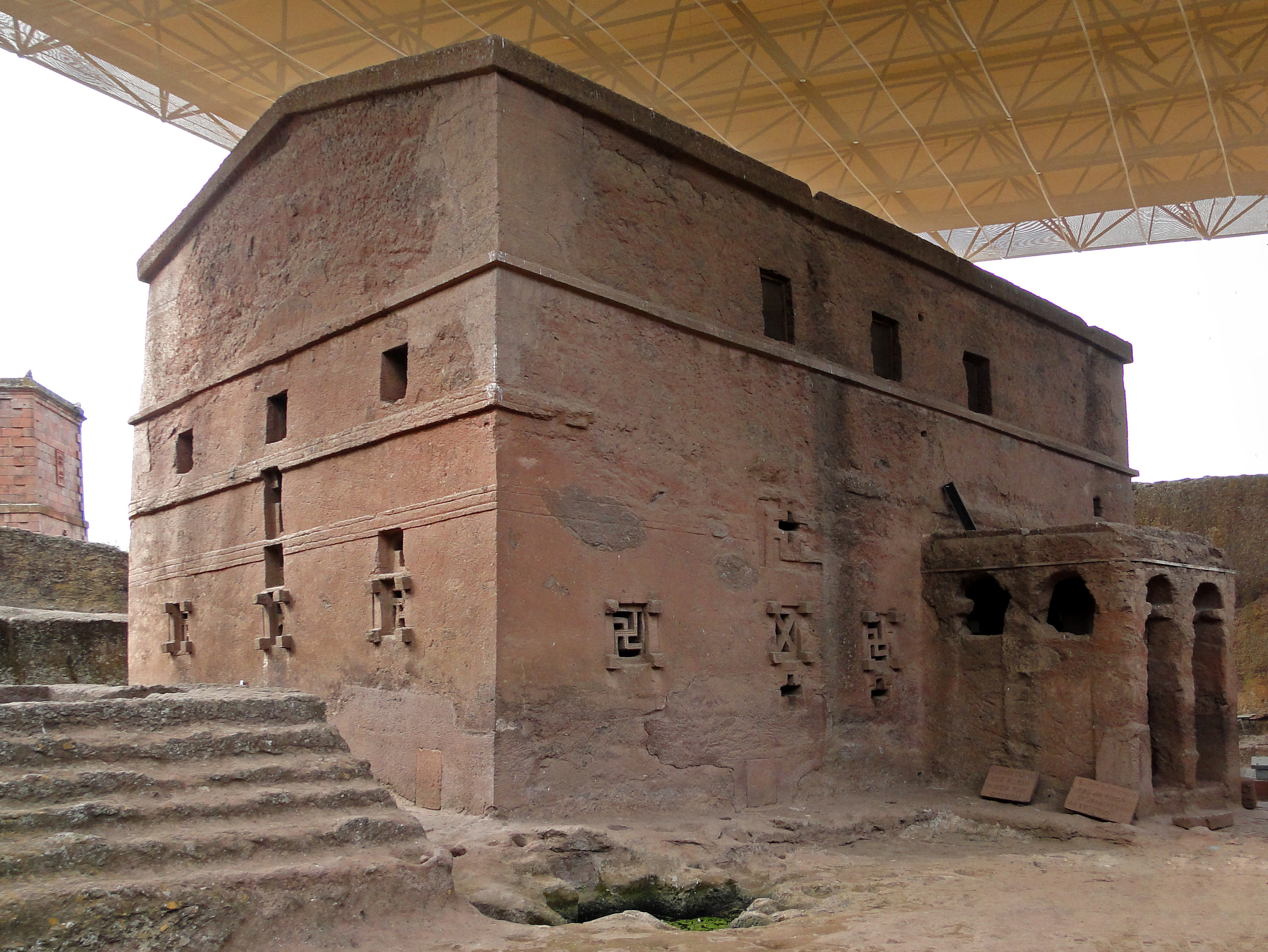
Bete Maryam

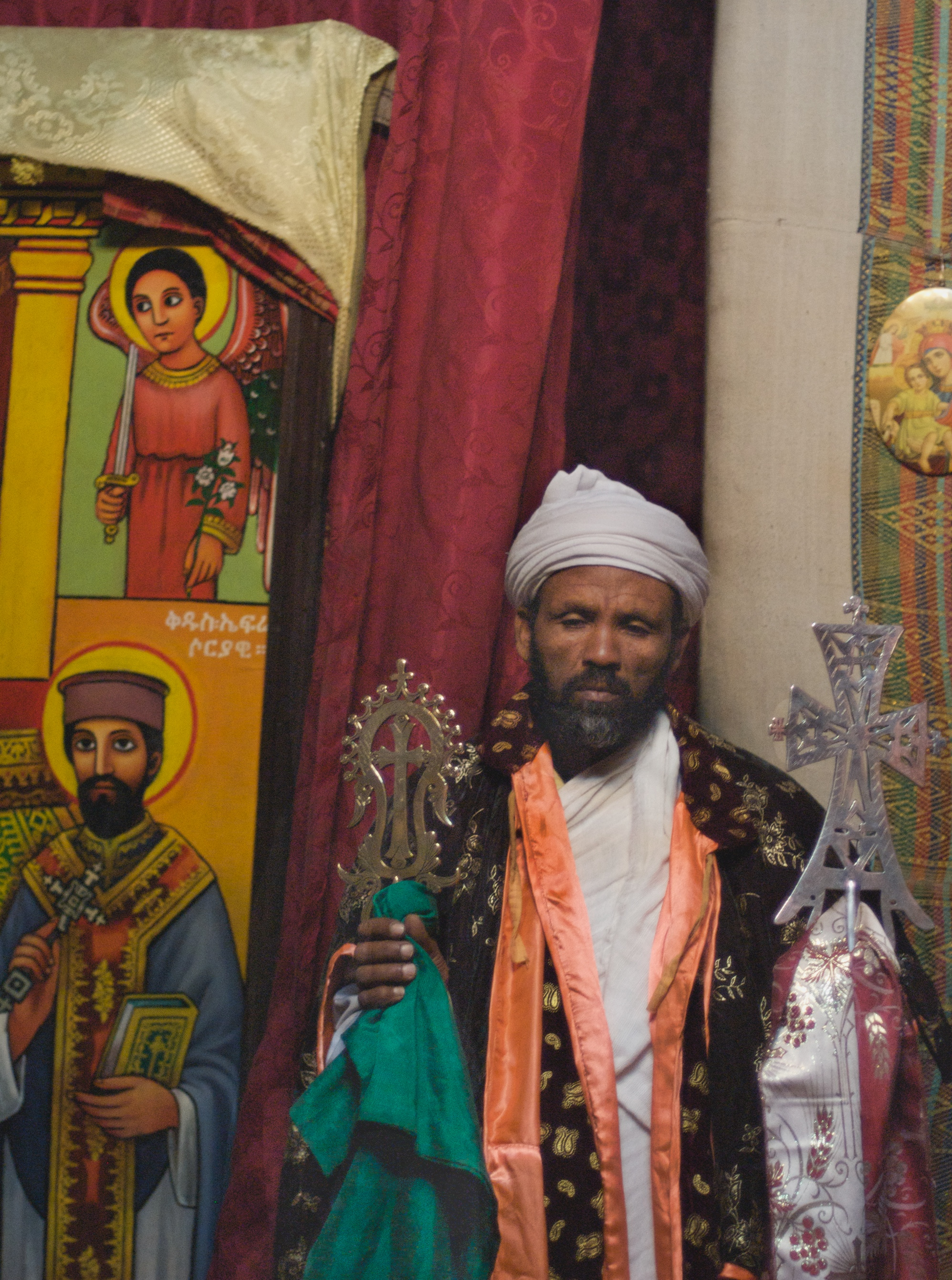
Priest with processional crosses at St. Mary's

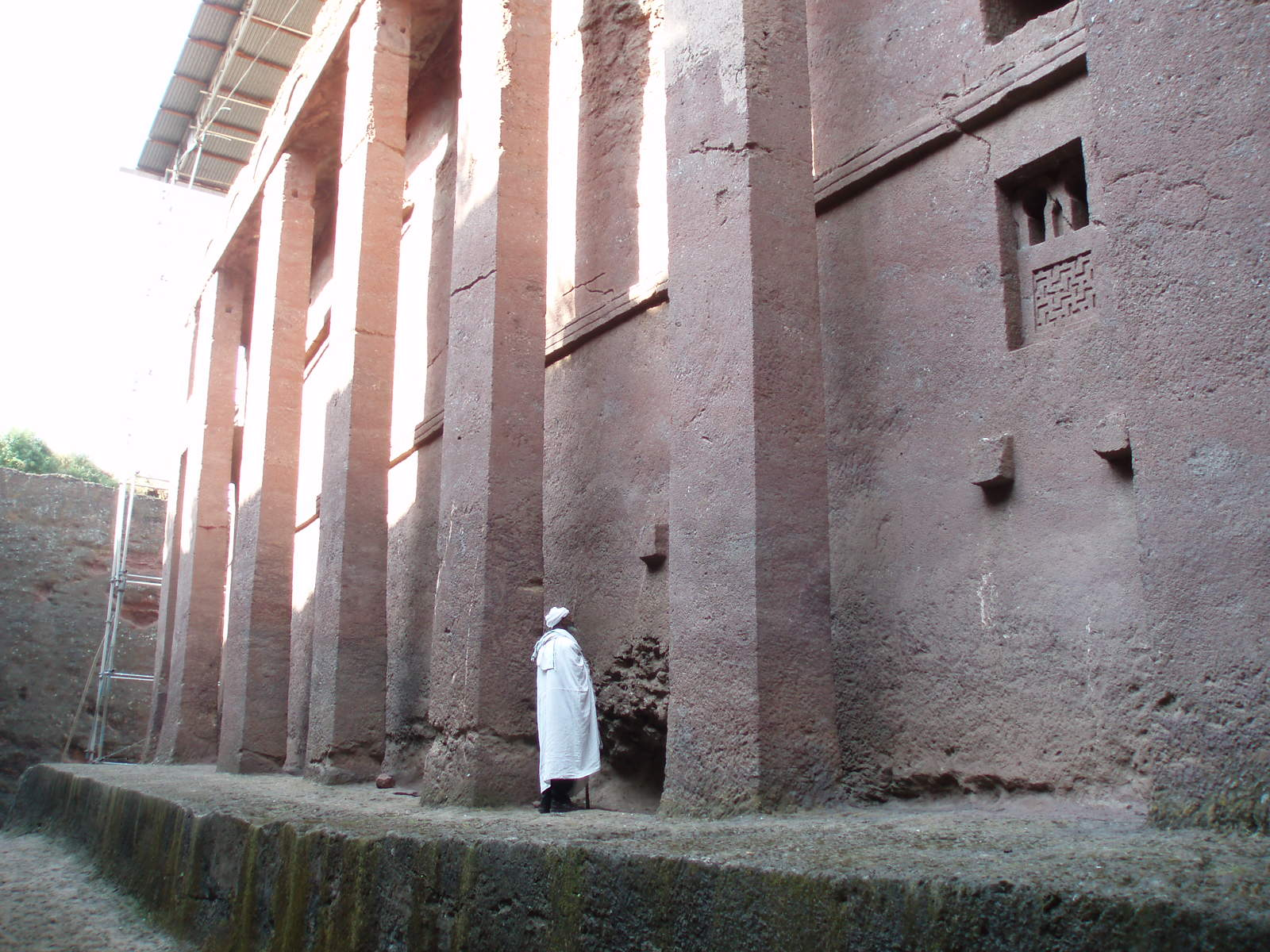
Man standing beside the walls of Biete Medhane Alem, believed to be the largest monolithic church in the world

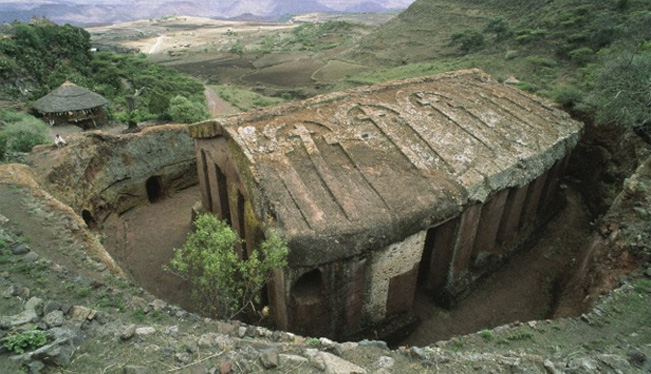
Genneta Maryam

Three-dimensional site scans of the Lalibela churches are also accessible online.

== See also ==
- Rock-cut architecture
- Monolithic church
- Rock-Hewn Churches, Lalibela
- List of World Heritage Sites in Ethiopia
- List of colossal sculptures in situ
