= Church of Saint George, Lalibela =

Rock-hewn church in Lalibela, Ethiopia

Church of Saint George
- ቤት ጊዮርጊስ
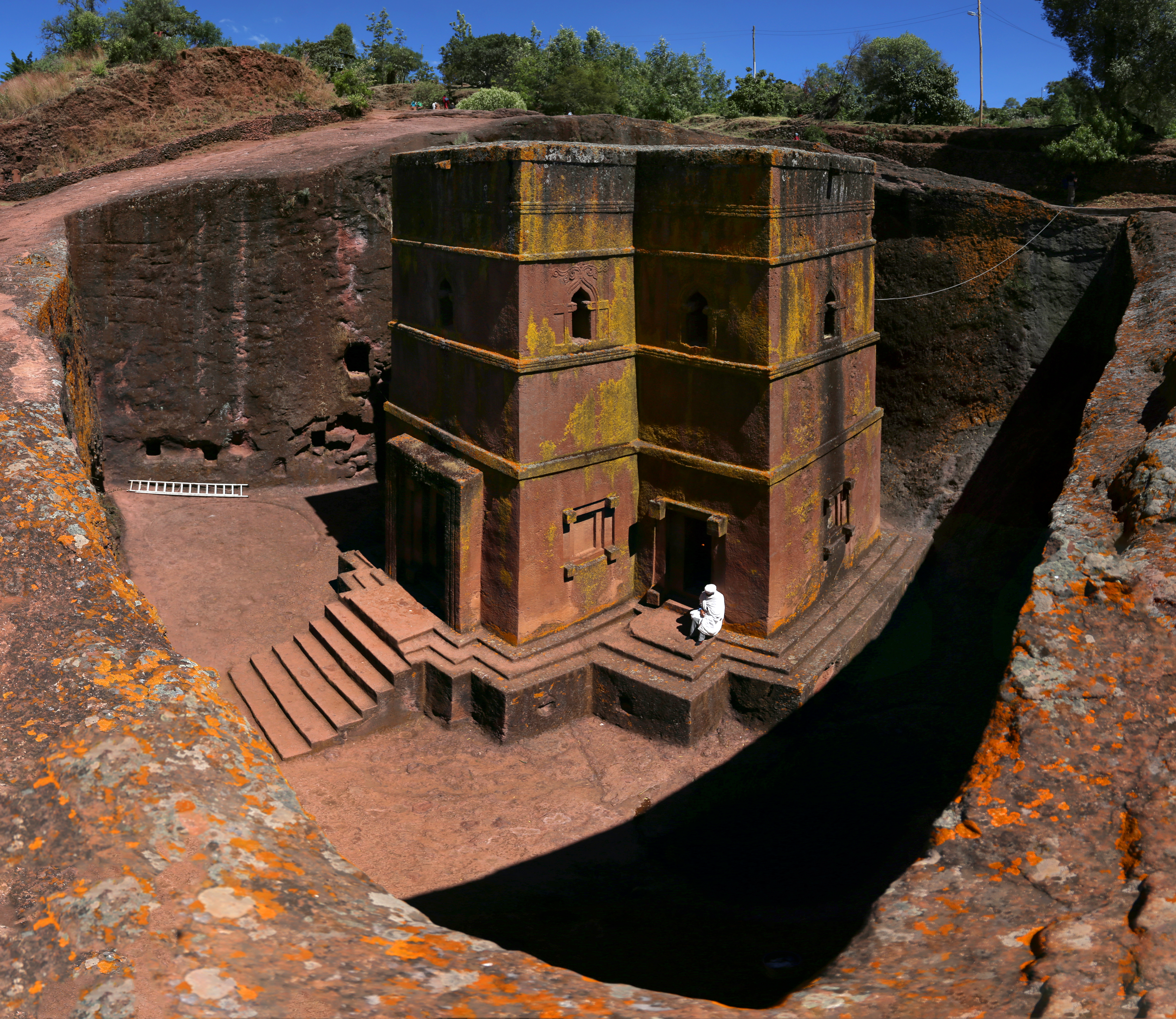
- Church of St. George, rock-hewn in the shape of a cross

- Location within Ethiopia
- 12°01′54″N 39°02′28″E
- Location: Lalibela, North Wollo Zone, Amhara Region
- Country: Ethiopia
- Denomination: Ethiopian Orthodox Tewahedo Church

Architecture
- Architectural type: Monolithic church

UNESCO World Heritage Site
- Type: Cultural
- Criteria: i, ii, iii
- Designated: 1978
- Part of: Rock-Hewn Churches, Lalibela
- Reference no.: 18
- Region: Africa

The Church of Saint George (Amharic: ቤተ ጊዮርጊስ, romanized: Betä Giyorgis) is one of eleven rock-hewn monolithic churches in Lalibela, a town in the Amhara Region of Ethiopia. Originally named Roha (Warwar), the historical and religious site was named Lalibela after the King Gebre Mesqel Lalibela of the Zagwe dynasty, who commissioned its construction. He is regarded as a saint by the Ethiopian Orthodox Tewahedo Church.

== History ==
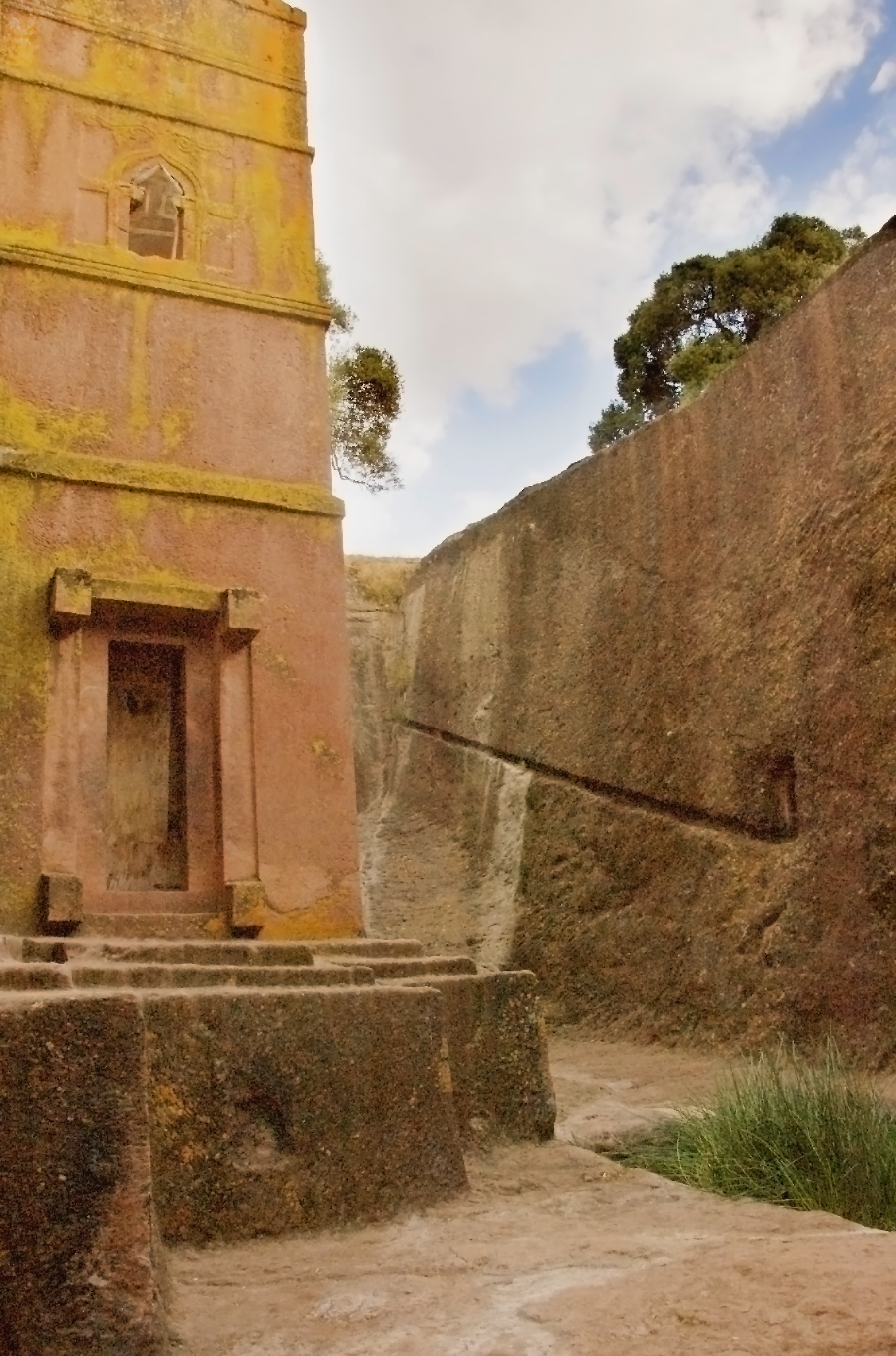
Bete Giyorgis base

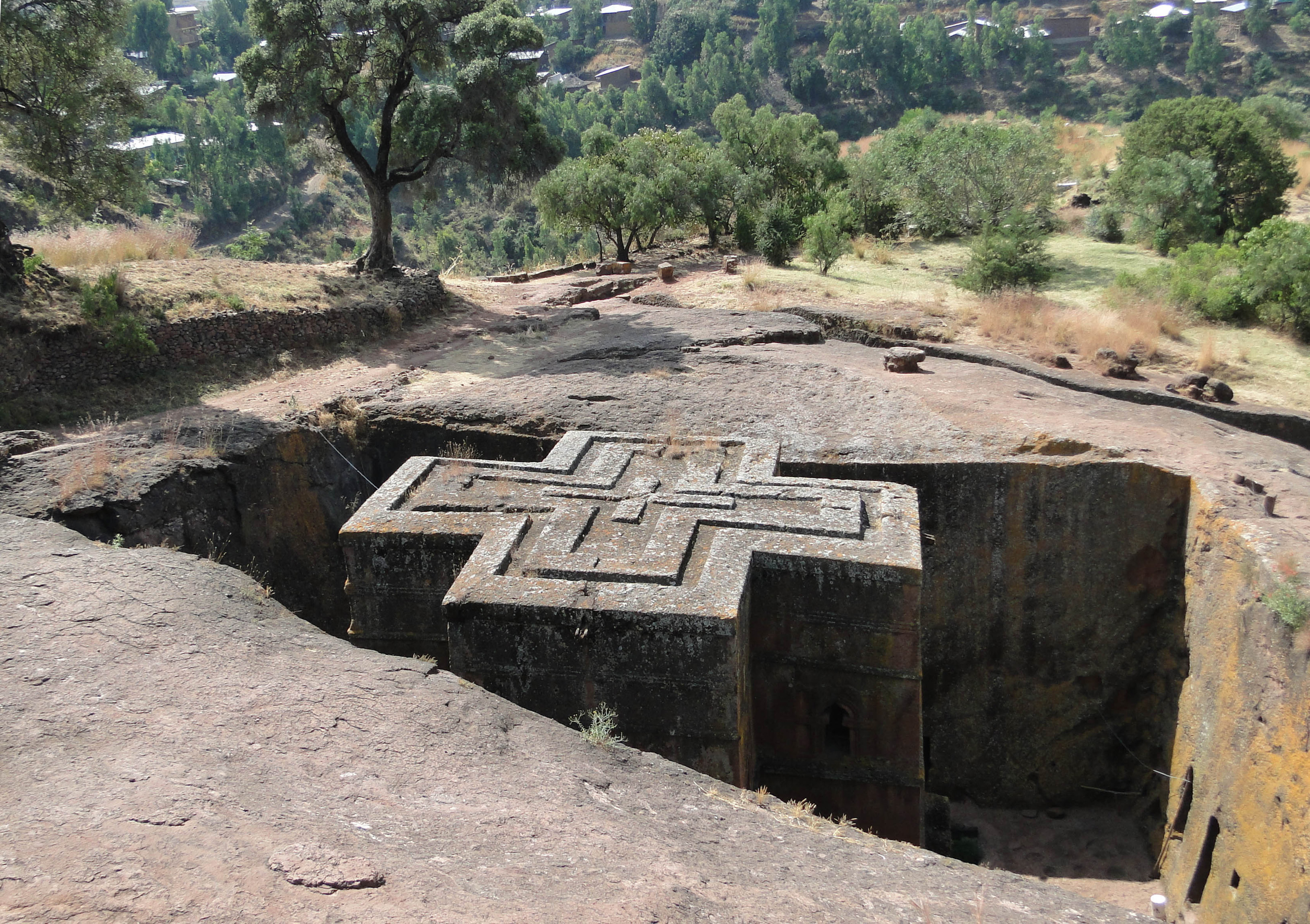
Betä Giyorgis (Church of St. George) from above, one of the rock-hewn churches of Lalibela

The Church of Saint George was carved downwards from a type of volcanic tuff. This is the sole architectural material that was used in the structure. It has been dated to the late 12th or early 13th century AD, and thought to have been constructed during the reign of King Gebre Mesqel Lalibela, of the late Zagwe dynasty. It is among the best known and last built of the eleven churches in the Lalibela area, and has been referred to as the "Eighth Wonder of the World". Lalibela, King of Ethiopia, sought to recreate Jerusalem, and structured the churches' landscape and religious sites in such a way as to achieve such a feat. "The churches at Lalibela are clustered in two major groups, one representing the earthly Jerusalem, and the other representing the heavenly Jerusalem. Located directly between them is a trench representing the River Jordan". The dimensions of the trench are 25 meters by 25 meters by 30 meters, and there is a small baptismal pool outside the church, which stands in an artificial trench.

According to Ethiopian cultural history, Betä Giyorgis was built after King Gebre Mesqel Lalibela of the Zagwe dynasty had a vision in which he was instructed to construct the church; Saint George and God have both been referred to as the one who gave him the instructions.

Lalibela is a pilgrimage site for members of the Ethiopian Orthodox Tewahedo Church; the church itself is part of the UNESCO World Heritage Site "Rock-Hewn Churches, Lalibela".

On first approach the site appears wholly inaccessible, with sheer drops on every side and no access bridge. It is accessed via a very narrow man-made canyon, spiralling downwards, which changes to a tunnel close to the church, to further conceal its presence.

Pilgrims who died after reaching the site are placed in a simple open tomb on the outer walls.

The hollowed interior contains a simple shrine to St. George and, behind a curtain (forbidden to view apart from priests) lies a replica of the Ark of the Covenant.

Betä Giyorgis was spatially documented in 2005.

== See also ==
- List of colossal sculptures in situ
- Saint George in devotions, traditions and prayers
