= Biete Medhane Alem =

Monolith rock-cut church in Ethiopia

Coordinates: 12.0337°N 39.0437°E

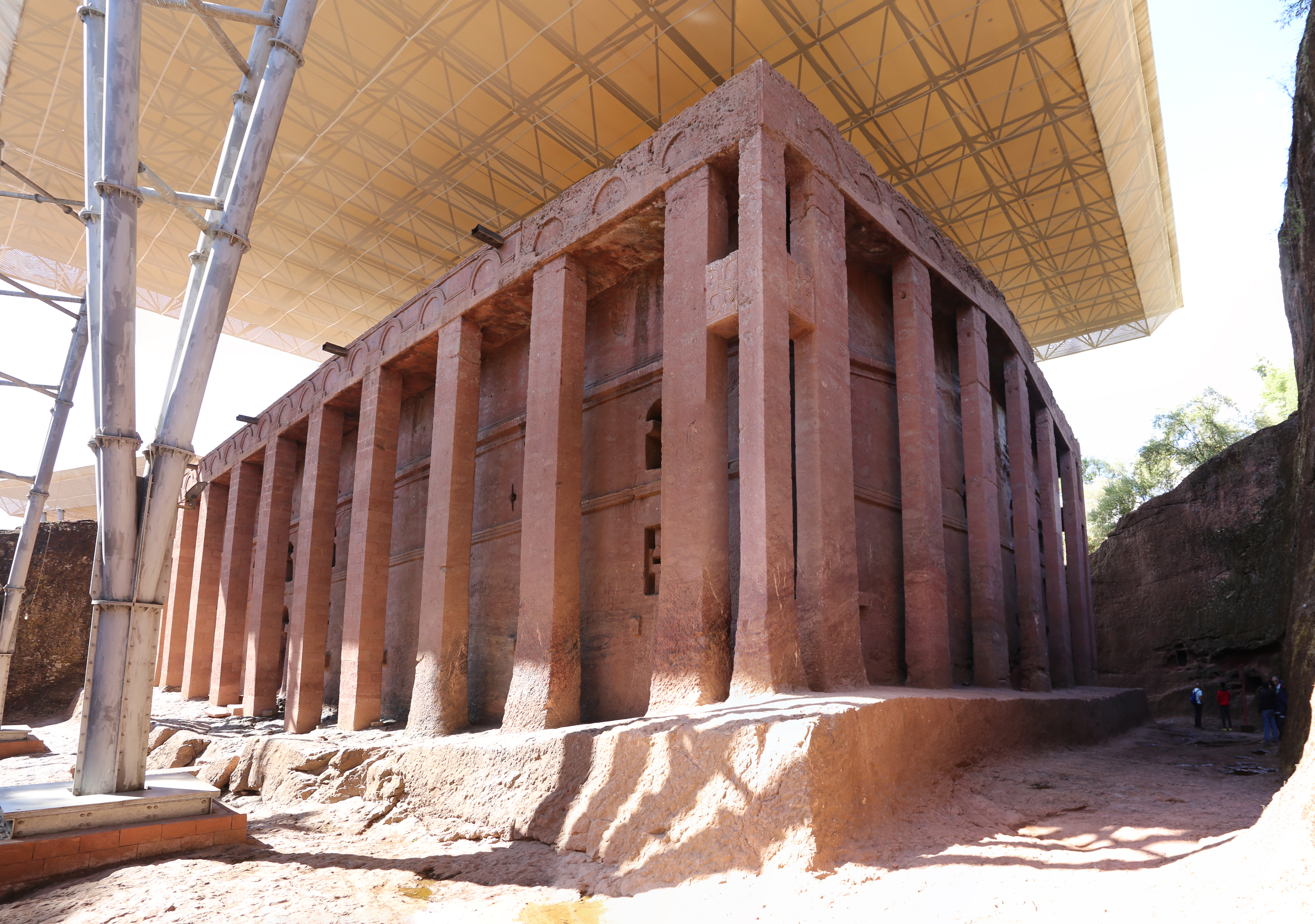
The rock church Biete Medhane Alem in Lalibela, Ethiopia

Biete Medhane Alem is an Orthodox underground monolith rock-cut church located in Lalibela, Ethiopia. It was built during the Zagwe dynasty. It is part of the UNESCO World Heritage Site at Lalibela. Biete Medhane Alem (House of the Saviour of the World) is home to the Lalibela Cross.
