= Biete Amanuel =

Rock-hewn church in Lalibela, Ethiopia

Coordinates: 12.03182°N 39.04556°E

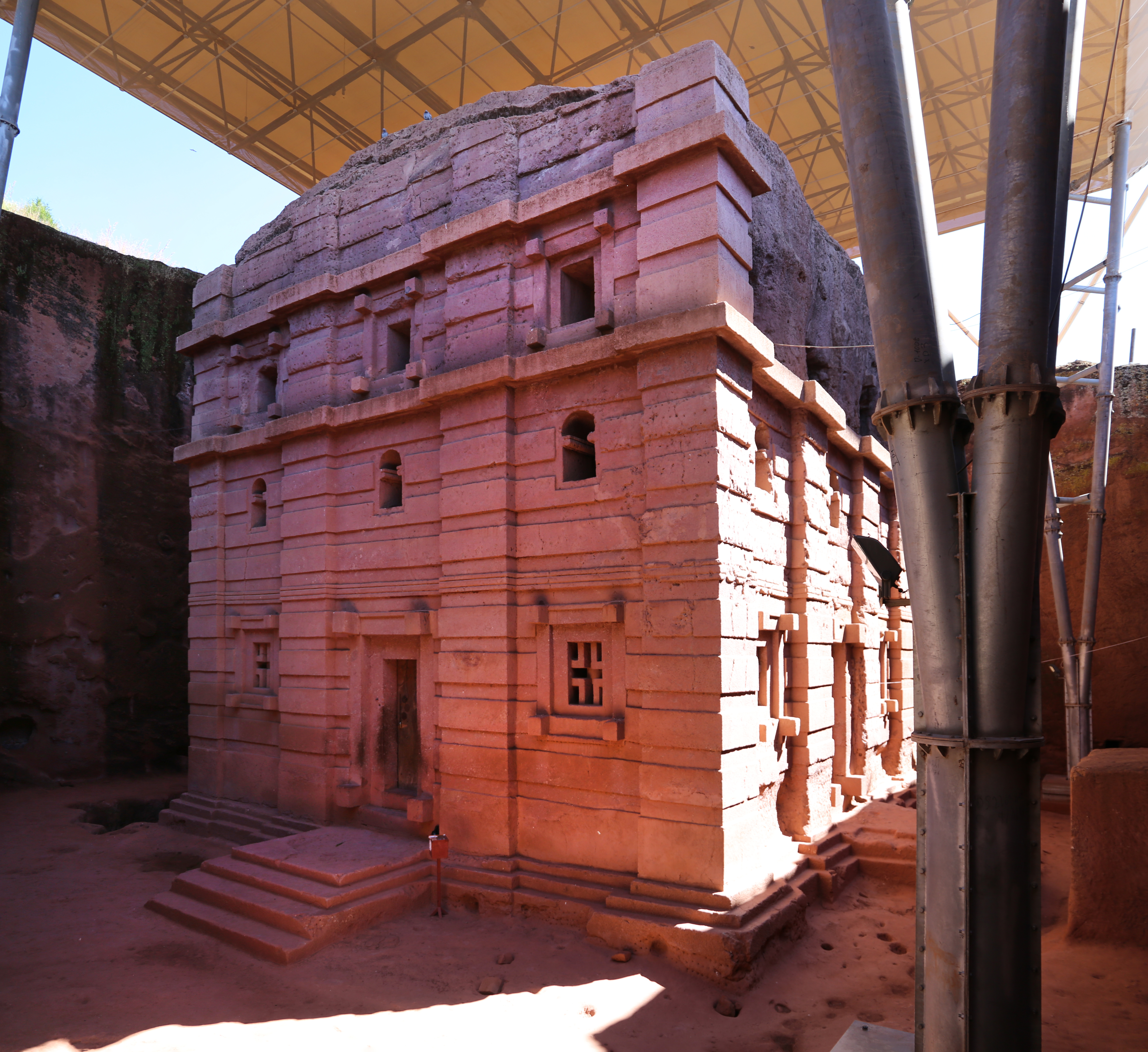
The rock church Biete Amanuel in Lalibela, Ethiopia

Biete Amanuel ('House of Emmanuel') is an underground Ethiopian Orthodox monolith rock-cut church located in Lalibela, Ethiopia. The edifice was built during the Kingdom of Aksum. It is part of a World Heritage Site, the Rock-Hewn Churches, Lalibela. Biete Amanuel is possibly the former royal chapel.
