= Lalibela Cross =

Processional cross of Lalibela civilization

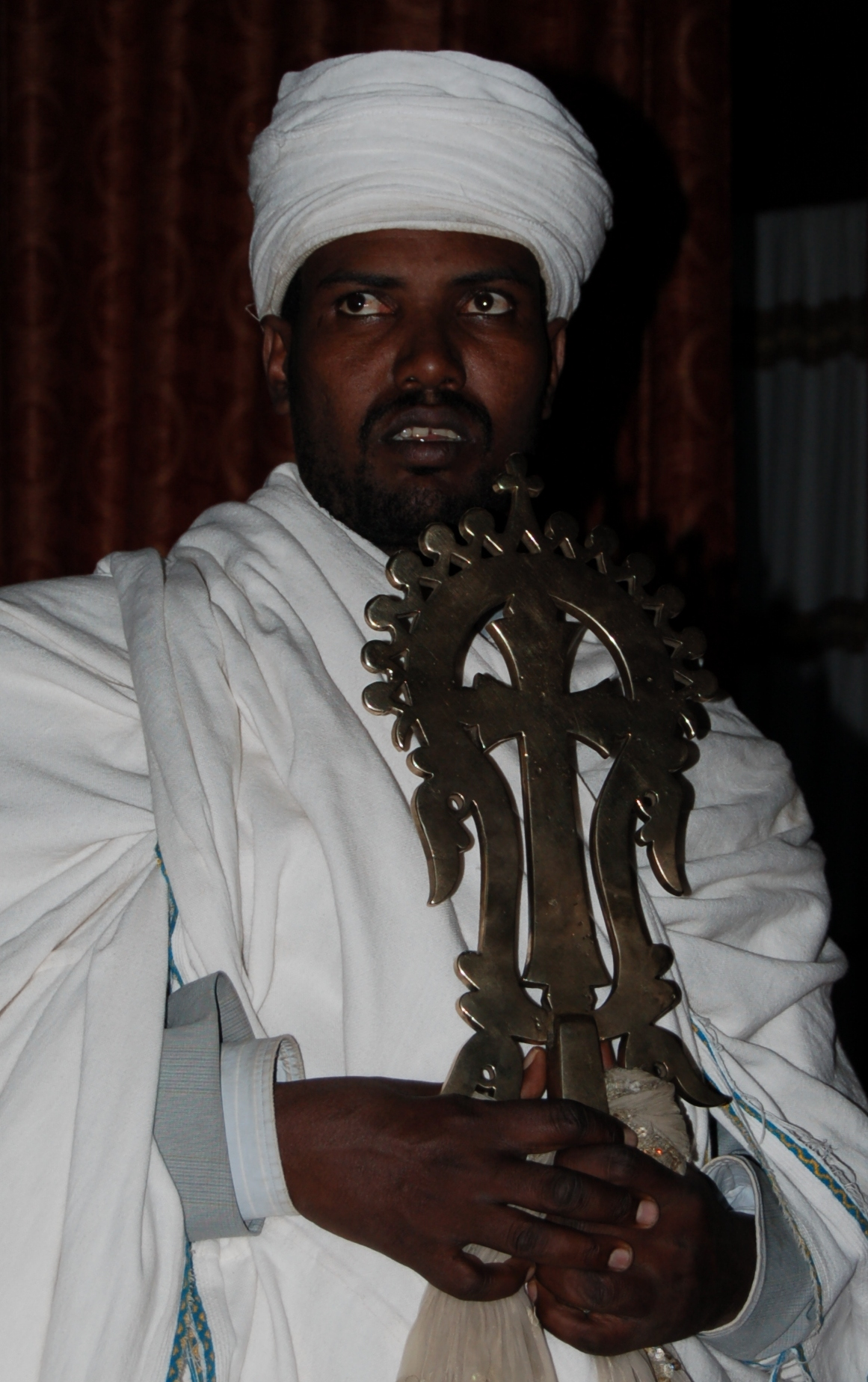
The Lalibela Cross

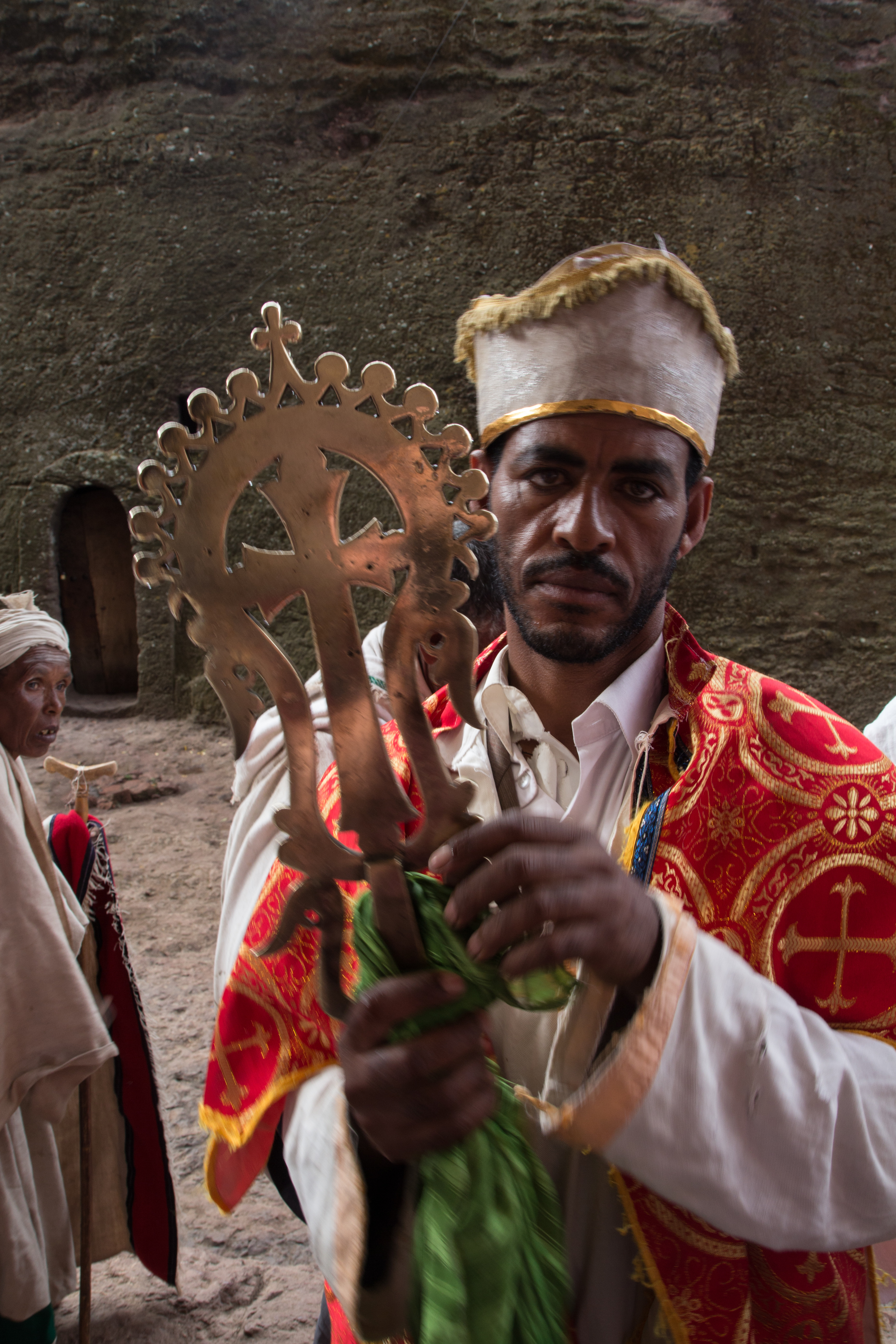
The Lalibella Cross

The Lalibela Cross is a large, elaborately decorated processional cross variation of the Ethiopian cross, considered one of Ethiopia's most precious religious and historical heirlooms. It is held by the Bet Medhane Alem, the House of the Redeemer of the World, a 12th-century rock-cut church in Lalibela. A priest may rub believers with the cross to bless them or heal them. The style of the cross was common in its time and those of this style are often simply referred to today as "Lalibela crosses".

The cross is thought to date to the 12th century. It is around 60 centimetres (24 in) long and weighs around 7 kilograms (15 lb). It is made from one piece of metal, either gold, or bronze and gold. The central cross has an elongated descending arm and flared ends surrounded by an elaborately ornamented encircling band. Like many Ethiopian processional crosses, the bottom of the cross is supported by "Adam's arms", a motif that realistically or abstractly portrays the arms of Adam. On processional crosses they are draped with brightly colored pieces of cloth for festive occasions.

The cross was stolen in March 1997, but located in Belgium in 1999, when a dealer in Addis Ababa sold it to a Belgian collector for US$25,000. After the collector's money was returned and it was agreed that no further legal action would be taken, the cross was returned to Ethiopia in 2001.
