= Biete Qeddus Mercoreus =

Underground Orthodox church located in Ethiopia

Coordinates: 12.03157°N 39.04548°E

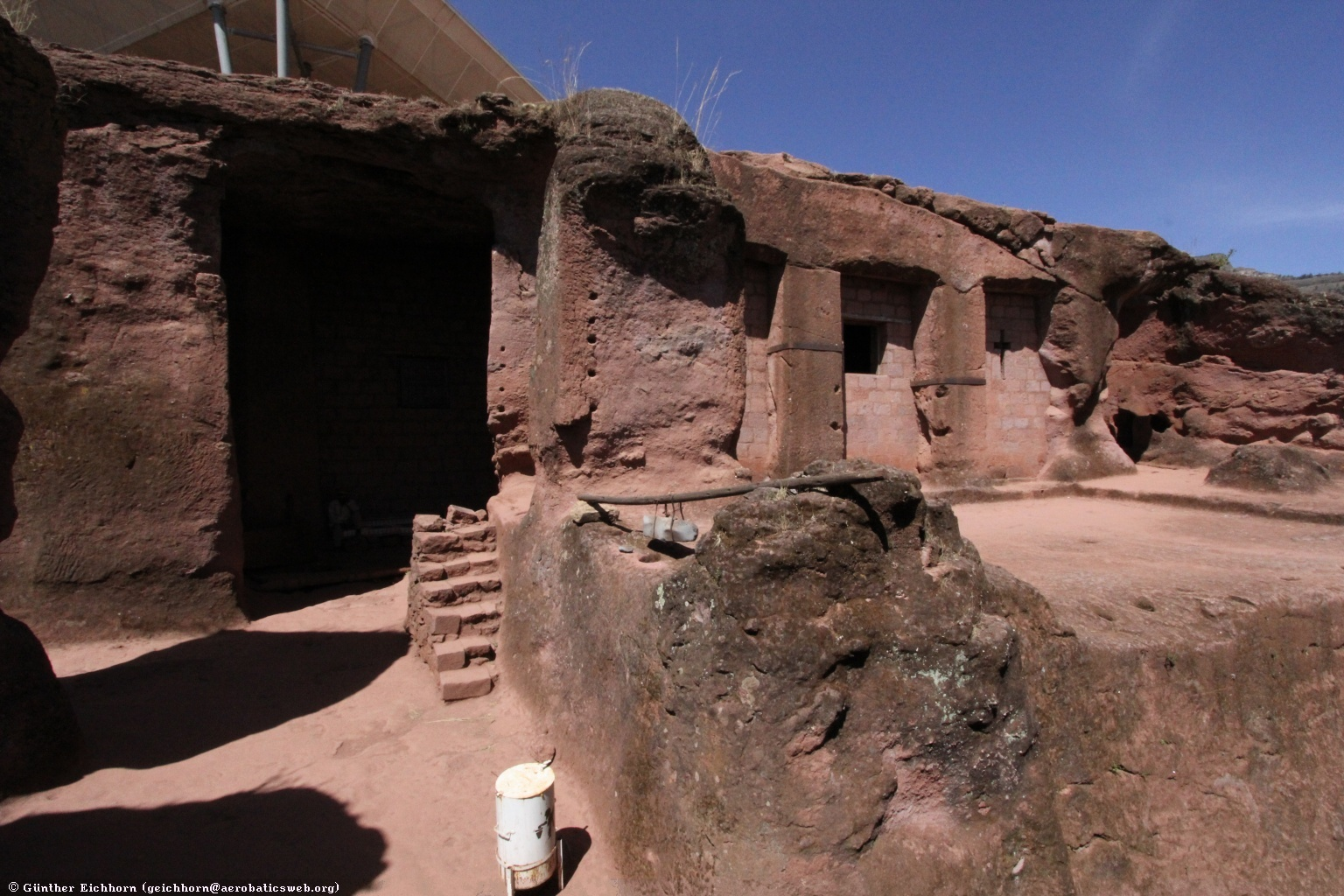
The rock church Biete Qeddus Mercoreus in Lalibela, Ethiopia

Biete Qeddus Mercoreus is an underground Orthodox rock-cut monolith church located in Lalibela, Ethiopia. It was built during the Kingdom of Axum. It is part of UNESCO World Heritage Site at Lalibela. Biete Qeddus Mercoreus (House of St. Mercoreos/House of St. Mark) may be a former prison because of ankle shackles found there.
