= Biete Gabriel-Rufael =

Church in Lalibela, Ethiopia

Coordinates: 12.03120°N 39.04464°E

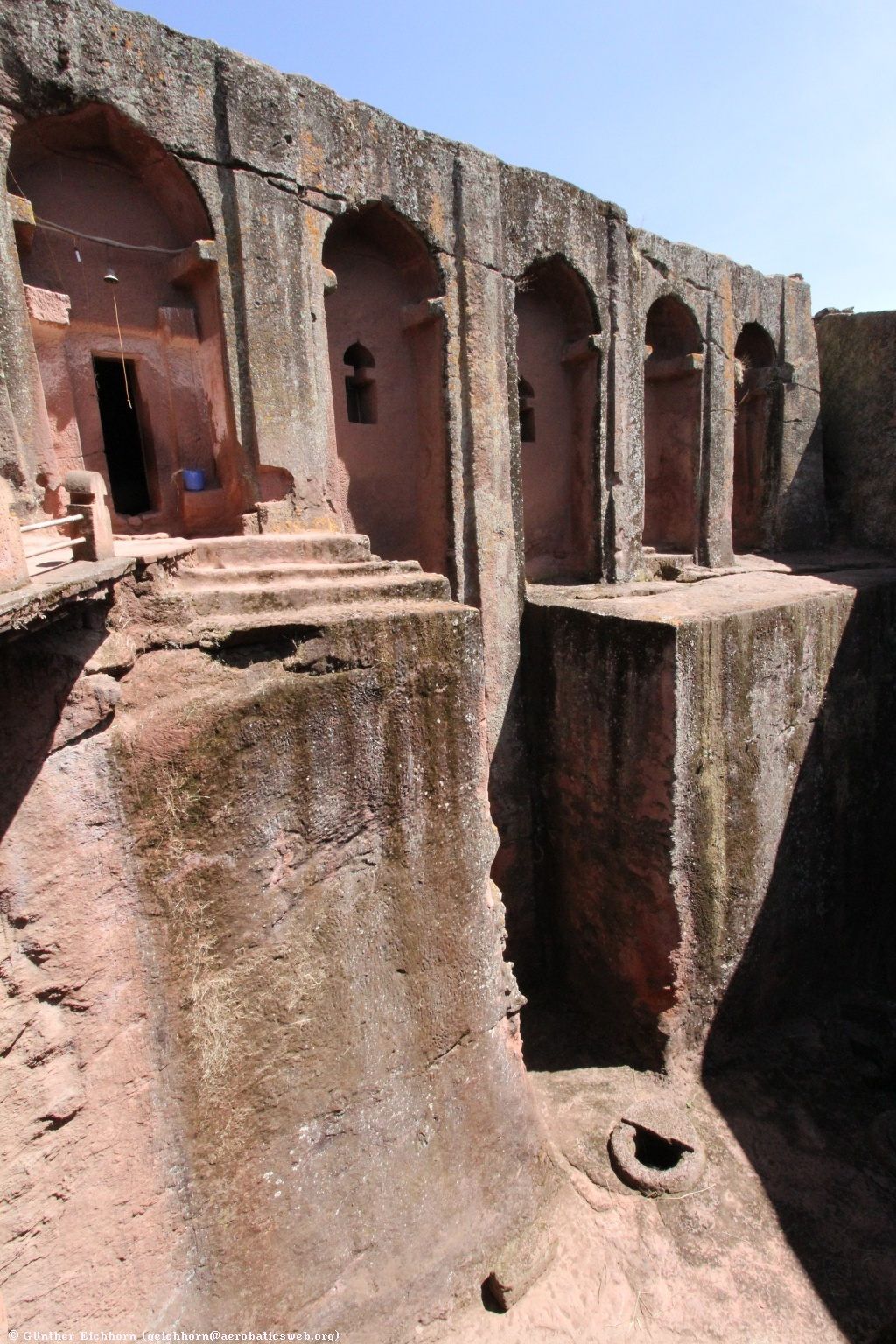
The rock church Biete Gabriel-Rufael in Lalibela, Ethiopia

Biete Gabriel-Rufael is an underground monolith rock-cut church located in Lalibela, Ethiopia. The Orthodox church was built during the Kingdom of Axum. It is part of UNESCO World Heritage Site at Lalibela. Biete Gabriel-Rufael (House of the angels Gabriel and Raphael) is possibly a former royal palace, linked to a holy bakery.
