= Biete Lehem =

Church in Lalibela, Ethiopia

Coordinates: 12.03169°N 39.04451°E

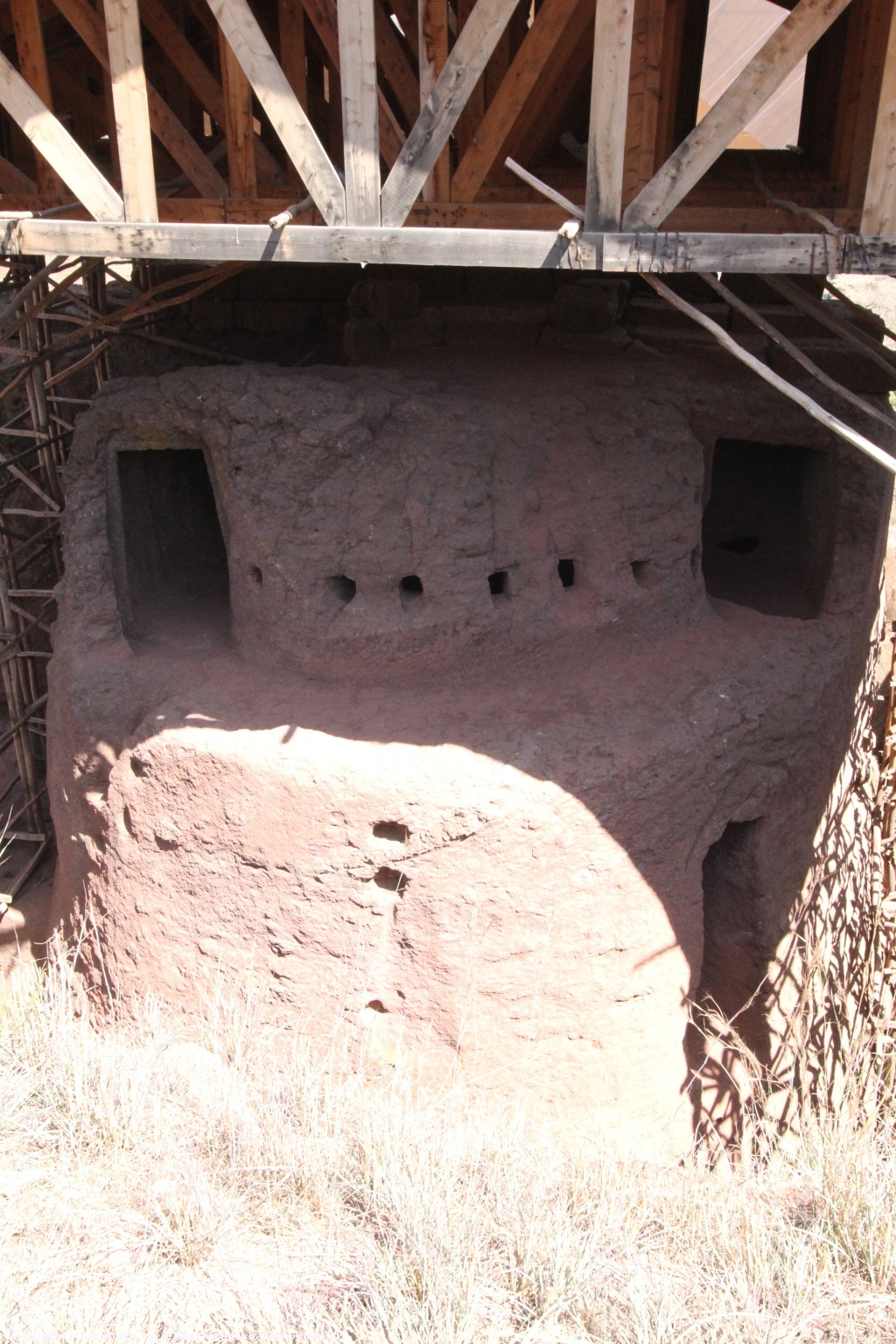
The rock church Biete Lehem in Lalibela, Ethiopia

Biete Lehem (Amharic: ቤተልሔም) is an underground monolith church carved into rock. It is located in Lalibela, Ethiopia. It was created during the Kingdom of Axum. It is part of UNESCO World Heritage Site at Lalibela. The name Biete Lehem is from Bethlehem Hebrew: בֵּית לֶחֶם (House of Holy Bread).
