= Biete Abba Libanos =

Monolithic church in Lalibela, Amhara Region, Ethiopia

Coordinates: 12.03141°N 39.04518°E

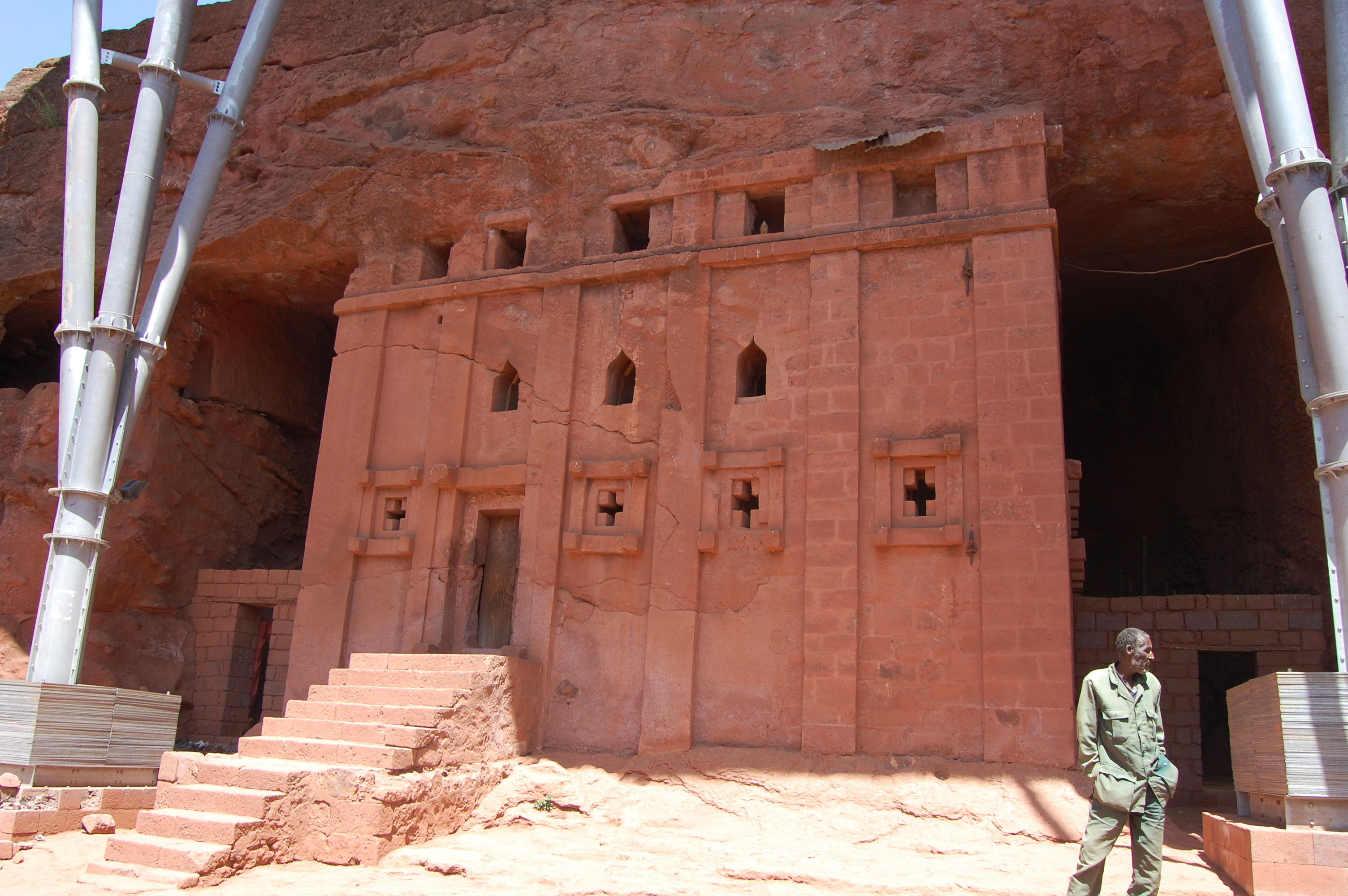
Entrance of Biete Abba Libanos

Biete Abba Libanos (House of Abbot Libanos) is an underground rock-cut monolith Orthodox church located in Lalibela, Ethiopia. It was built during the Kingdom of Axum. It is part of UNESCO World Heritage Site at Lalibela.
