= Biete Maryam =

Monolithic church in Lalibela, Amhara Region, Ethiopia

Coordinates: 12.03371°N 39.04333°E

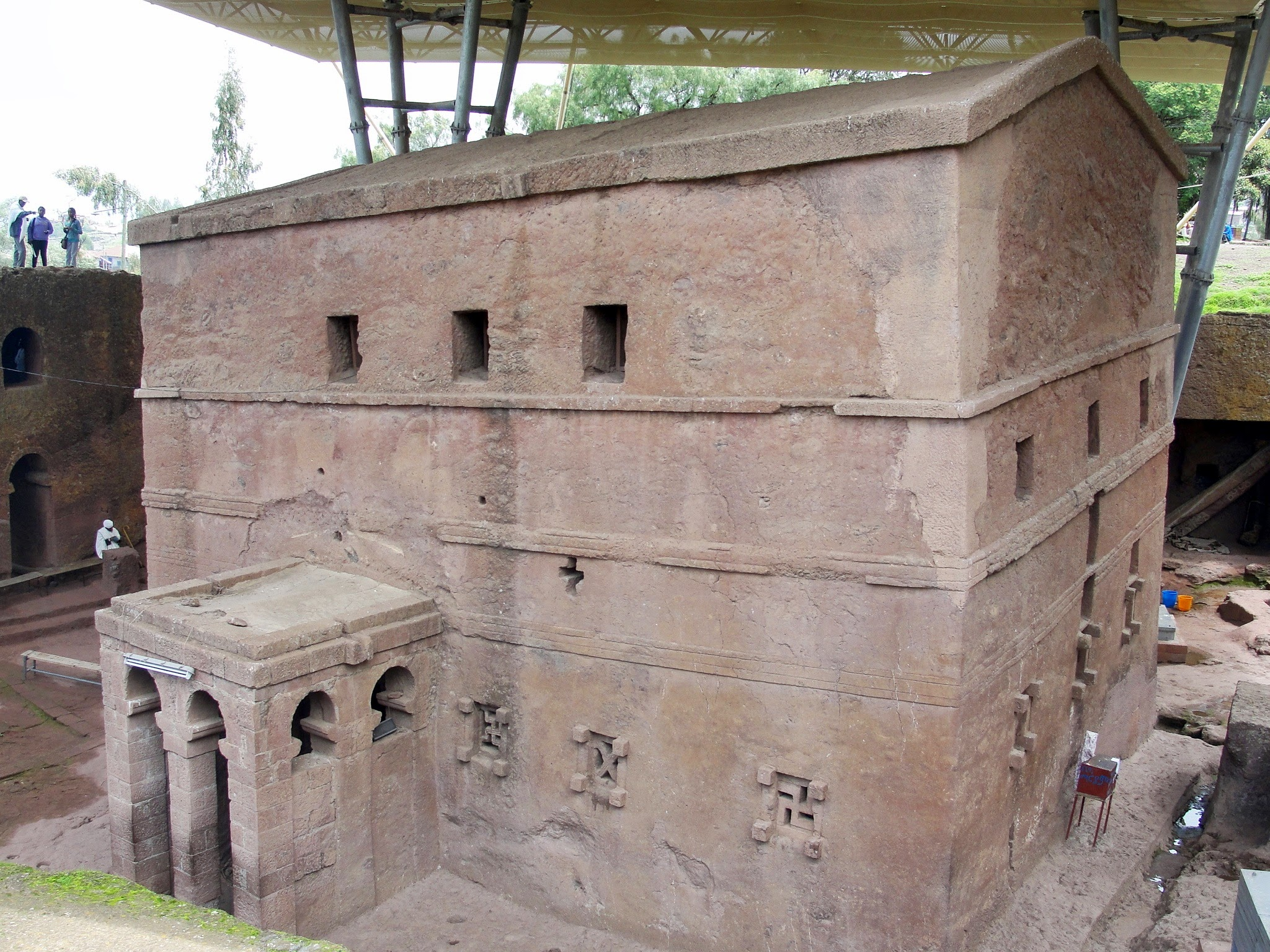
The rock church Biete Maryam in Lalibela, Ethiopia

Biete Maryam is one of the monolithic rock-cut Rock-Hewn Churches of Lalibela of the Ethiopian Orthodox Tewahedo Church. It is part of the UNESCO World Heritage Site at Lalibela.

== History ==
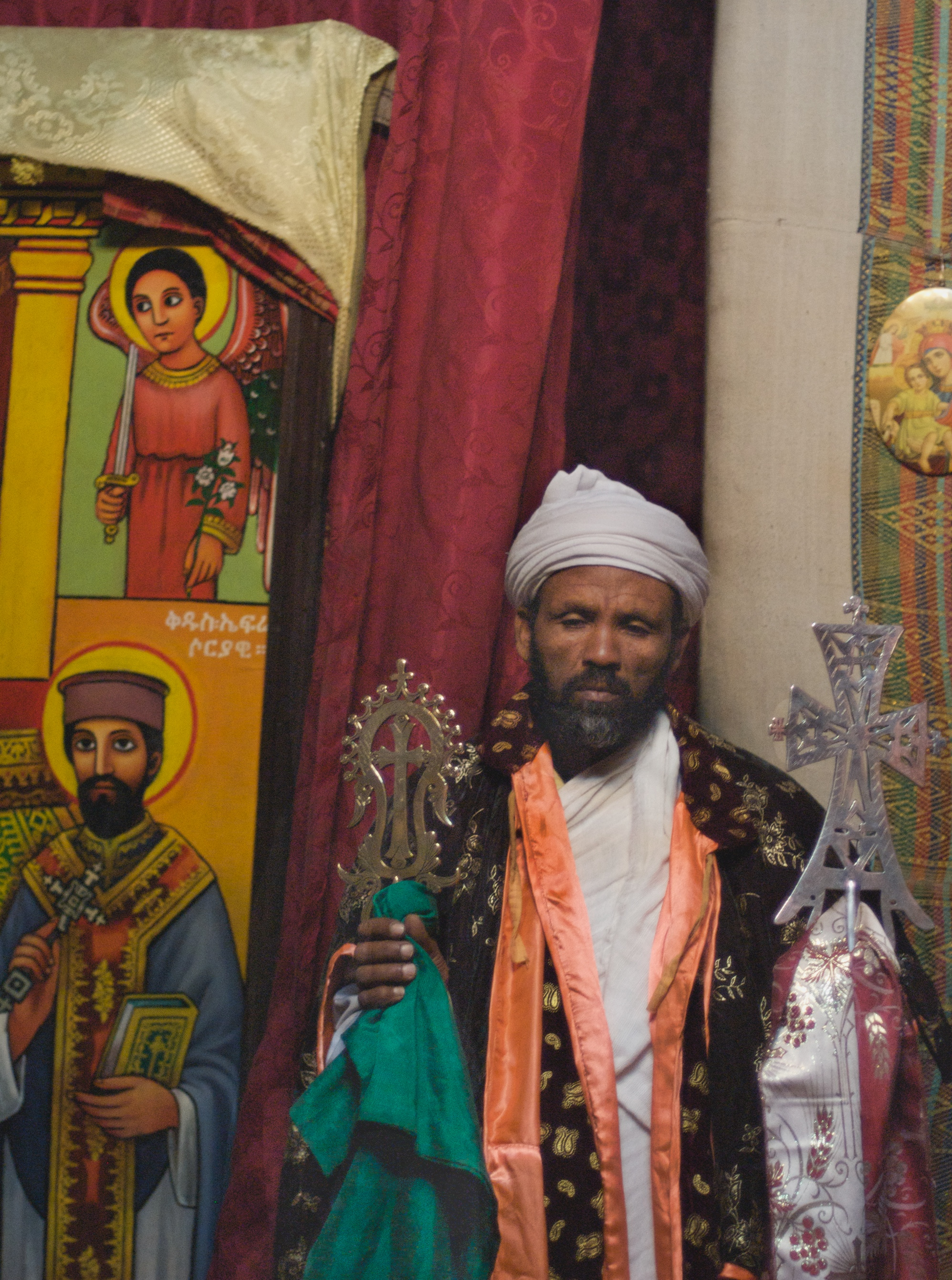
Inside the church, 2007

Like the other churches of Lalibela, its precise date of construction is unknown, although it was built no earlier than the 7th century AD (during the Kingdom of Axum) and no later than the 13th century AD (during the Solomonic dynasty and Ethiopian Empire). The churches of Lalibela, including Biete Maryam, are traditionally ascribed to having been built during the reign of the Zagwe dynasty ruler Gebre Mesqel Lalibela (r. ca. 1181–1221).

Archaeological analyses have discerned that the ruins of defensive fortifications date to roughly the 8th century AD, while the monolithic rock-cut churches were built in two stages: the first from the 11th to early 12th centuries, and the second phase from the late 12th to early 13th centuries.
