= Regnal lists of Ethiopia =

Traditional lists of monarchs of Ethiopia and Eritrea

Regnal lists of Ethiopia are recorded lists of monarchs who are claimed by tradition to have ruled the territory of modern-day Ethiopia and Eritrea, and the historical territory of the Kingdom of Aksum and the Ethiopian Empire. These lists are often recorded on manuscripts or orally by monasteries and have been passed down over the centuries.

Many surviving physical regnal lists, as well as recorded oral lists, chronicle the line of kings beginning with Menelik I to the Solomonic dynasty. According to tradition, Menelik is believed to be the son of queen Makeda (the Biblical Queen of Sheba) and king Solomon. The rulers that followed Menelik were the kings of Axum, the Zagwe dynasty and the Solomonic dynasty. Some traditions record monarchs who reigned before Menelik. These regnal lists were used to prove the longevity of the Ethiopian monarchy and to provide legitimacy for the Solomonic dynasty until its fall from power in 1974. Eritrea became de facto independent from Ethiopia in 1991, and thus literature on regnal lists before this usually referred to them simply as "Ethiopian" and/or "Axumite" regnal lists. These lists were also referred to as "Abyssinian" because Abyssinia was a term used historically to refer to the highland areas of modern Ethiopia and Eritrea.

== Traditions and origins of the lists ==
Ethiopian and Eritrean traditions record a range of different monarchs from earlier times whose existence has not been verified by modern-day archeology. Their stories and legends may have elements of truth but it is unclear to what extent this is the case. Numerous king lists have been recorded either on manuscripts or via oral tradition. However, surviving information on the kings prior to the reign of emperor Yekuno Amlak (1270–1285) is often scattered, incomplete or contradictory. The king lists that do refer to pre-1270 Ethiopia rarely match completely with one another. This variation is likely because the lists were compiled over a long time period across several different monasteries. It is also possible that the variations in succession order could be due to tampering with the lists after the 13th century that resulted from "dynastic quarrels" and "ideological re-readings" of the Axumite regnal lists.

Carlo Conti Rossini suggested the lists were compiled in the fourteenth or fifteenth centuries following the restoration of the Solomonic dynasty and were compiled from Arabic documents, inscriptions on coins and monuments, and, in the case of some names, from South Arabian mythology.

The chronography found in the regnal lists and related documents "seem to have developed following some points of the biblical chronological framework". The most common quoted points in the chronography in the lists are:

- The time from Arwe to Makeda – c. 800 years
- From Makeda to Bazen (in whose reign Christ was born) – c. 1,000 years
- From Bazen to the "brother-kings" Abreha and Atsbeha – c. 400 years
- The reign of Gebre Meskel
- The Zagwe dynasty
- The accession of emperor Yekuno Amlak – 1270 CE

== Regnal list variations ==
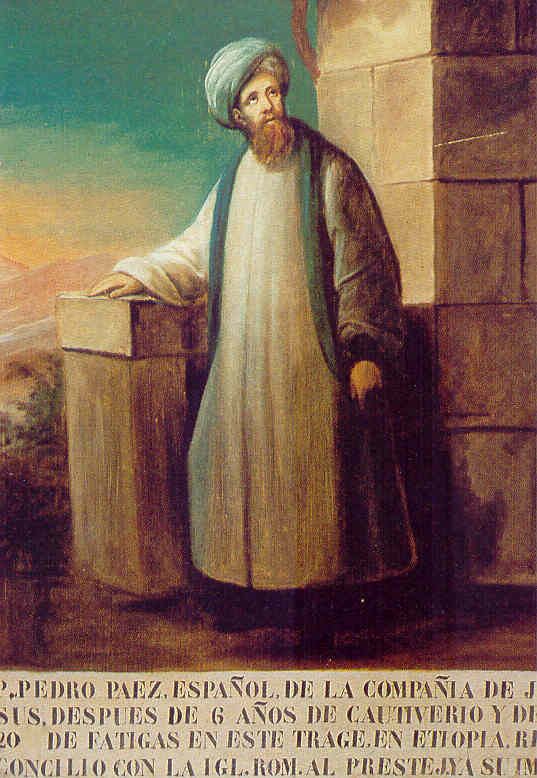
Spanish missionary Pedro Páez (1595–1678)

Historian Manfred Kropp noted that numerous regnal lists exist that date back to the 13th century and these are reliable documents. However, for the period before this there are only legendary memories of the Axumite rulers. Regnal lists were created to provide a connection between the Solomonic dynasty and the legendary Axumite kings while skipping the Zagwe dynasty. Such lists were written for the purpose of proving the legitimacy of the ruling Solomonic emperors and had information drawn from chronicles held in monasteries. Kropp believed that Ethiopian regnal lists were intended to fill in the gaps between major events, such as the meeting of Makeda and Solomon, the arrival of Frumentius and the beginning of the Zagwe dynasty. The great variation in names and order between regnal lists was likely because this process took place across several different monasteries and were also passed on orally.

Not all names on the regnal lists are Abyssinian in origin. Some names originate from South Arabian mythology, the religious language of Alexandria, and Greco-Roman sources, and transformed into local Abyssinian forms.

E. A. Wallis Budge commented that any written information on the period of Ethiopian history before the 13th century was "incomplete" and "untrustworthy". However, he felt that this was because any regnal lists or chronological works held in Axum were likely burned or destroyed before Yekuno Amlak ascended the throne in 1270. Budge noted that numerous regnal lists were known to exist in which the number and order of kings were rarely the same. He felt that it was clear that the chronographers of Abyssinia from the 13th and 14th centuries "did not know how many kings had reigned over [their country] from the time of Makeda [...] or the exact order of succession". Budge theorized that while the regnal lists showed evidence that they were based on legend and tradition, some parts of the list suggested that the scribes did indeed "[have] access to chronological and historical documents of some kind", including Coptic and Arabic texts which were possibly brought over by monks fleeing Egypt and Nubia during the time of the Arab conquests. Some lists began with Adam or David.

Spanish Missionary Pedro Páez believed that the reason for the differences in names on various lists was because the Ethiopian emperors used different names prior to their accession to the throne, and some lists used their regnal names while others listed their birth names. This was supposedly done in imitation of Menelik I, who was named David when he was crowned. E. A. Wallis Budge theorised that the existence of multiple king lists suggest that these represent rival claimants to the throne.

== Studies and comparisons of the regnal lists ==
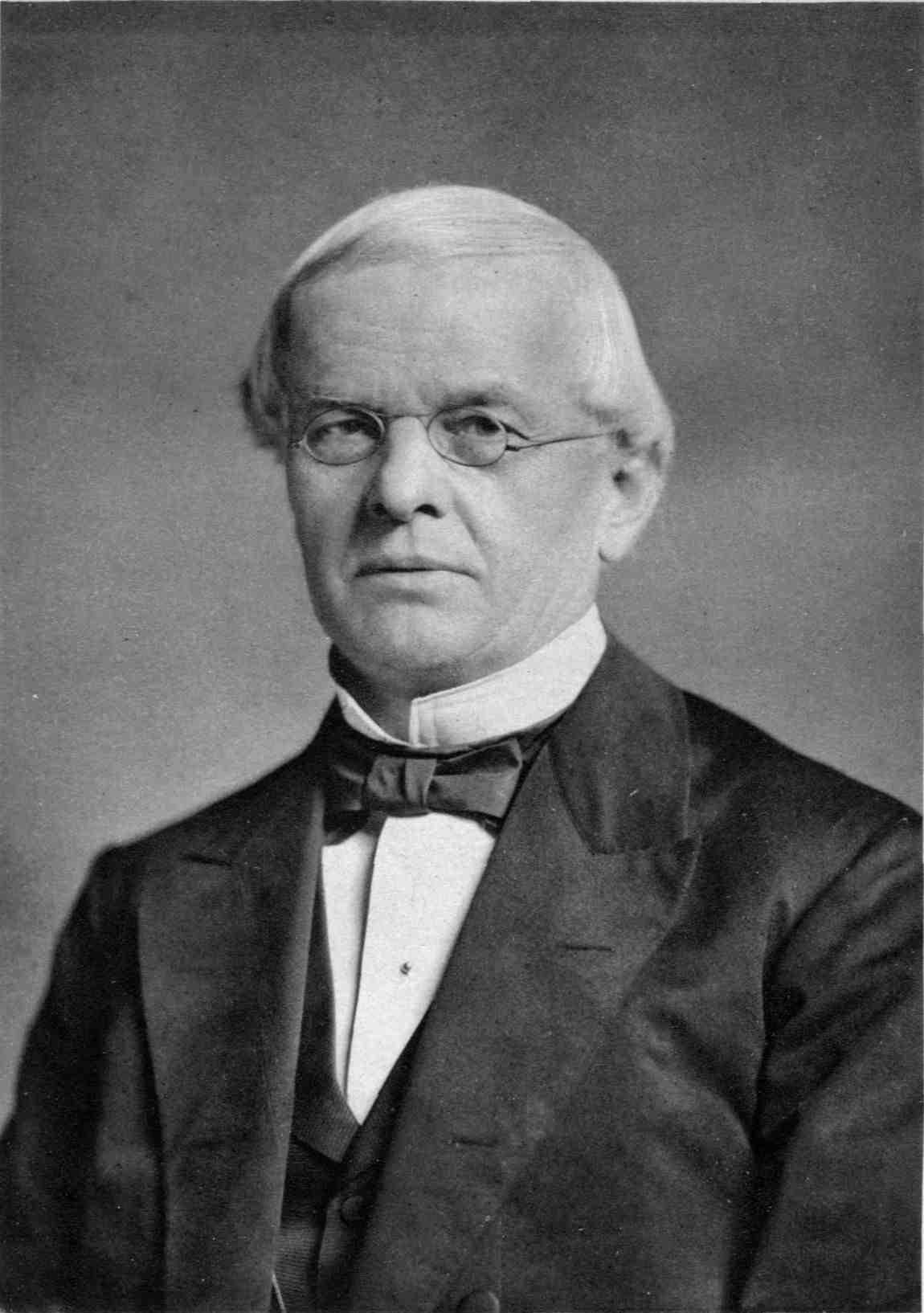
August Dillmann in 1894.

The book Chaldeae seu Aethiopicae linguae institutiones by Mariano Vittori was notable for being the first European book on Ge'ez grammar, and was published in Rome in 1552. There was a leaflet with a list of kings was included as an appendix containing 153 names up to emperor Lebna Dengel.

Two European missionaries in the 16th and 17th centuries, Pedro Páez and Manuel de Almeida, visited Ethiopia and personally saw two different regnal lists on which they based their respective writings on the history of Ethiopia. The manuscripts likely dated to before 1620. Both Páez and de Almeida stated that the Ethiopian emperor lent them books from the church of Axum containing the regnal lists.

August Dillmann wrote an article comparing the regnal lists in 1853. Dillman compared three lists and simply named them as A, B and C. Dillmann believed that list A was the longest because it included all rulers, regents, co-regents, pretenders and even heads of individual parts of the empire, while lists B and C only had the most important names.

Carlo Conti Rossini attempted to co-ordinate and compare the large number of different regnal lists, bringing together 86 different lists from libraries in Ethiopia and Italian Eritrea. The lists were divided into eight groups based on similarities and number of kings, and they were categorized by the letters A to H. Rossini's list A, B and C match Dillmann's C, B and A respectively.

Across Rossini's different lists, no name appears on all lists and no individual list contains all recorded names. The most common names to appear on the lists are Menelik I, Bazen, Abreha and Atsbeha and Gebre Meskel.

== Regnal lists of the Aksumite period ==
The following section details the types of regnal lists that chronicle the rulers of modern-day Ethiopia and Eritrea before the Zagwe dynasty, covering both the legendary and historical periods of the Kingdom of Aksum.

=== Dillmann List A / Rossini List C ===
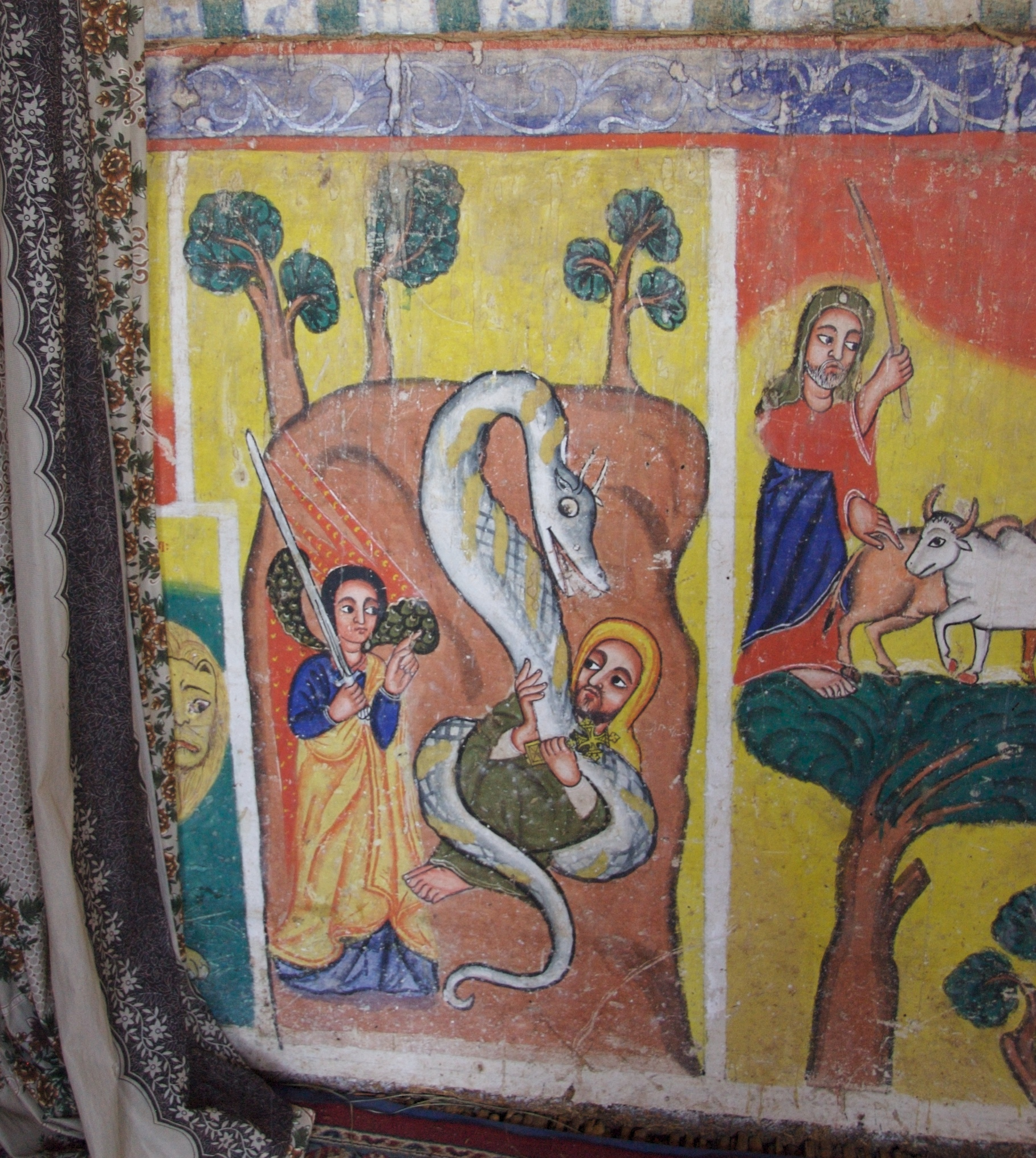
Painting of Arwe from the Church of Ura Kidane Mihret, Zege Peninsula, Lake Tana, Ethiopia.

August Dillmann's List A and Carlo Conti Rossini's List C both begin with the legendary serpent king Arwe and end with the Axumite king Gebre Meskel, containing 91 names. The names and regnal lengths below are taken from these two lists. Reign lengths in italics are outliers that only appear on a few lists, and priority is given to reign lengths that appear on both Dillmann's and Rossini's lists. Names can vary greatly across regnal lists, so priority for names is also given to those that appear on both lists.

Dillmann noted that his list A could be found in the works of Mariano Vittori, James Bruce, Edmond Combes, Maurice Tamisier and Eduard Rüppell.

Dillmann believed that list A was the longest of the three he compiled because it included all rulers, regents, co-regents, pretenders and even heads of individual parts of the empire, while lists B and C only had the most important names.

Rossini's list C was based on 16 documents dating to the 16th–19th centuries. These include certain copies of the Kebra Nagast and regnal lists recorded by Pedro Páez, Manuel de Almeida and Mariano Vittori.

Because this list ends with Gebre Meskel and does not continue to the end of the Axumite kingdom, some writers chose to 'complete' the line of kings by using other lists. Dillmann noted that Eduard Rüppell continued by using list B, while Mariano Vittori used what Dillmann called list C. James Bruce's list diverges after the reign of Bazen and matches Dillmann's list C/Rossini's list A after this point.

The following table is mostly based on Dillmann's and Rossini's lists, but will also include information from these sources:

- Chaldeae seu Aethiopicae linguae institutiones by Mariano Vittori (1552). (Note: Referred to as list "A2" by Dillmann.)
- The second of three regnal lists recorded by Pedro Páez in his book História da Etiópia (1620). Páez believed this list contained the throne names kings took upon their accession, while he thought his first list contained birth names. A manuscript from Debre Libanos of unknown age has a similar line of succession to this list.
- Travels to Discover the Source of the Nile (Volume 2) by James Bruce (1790). He had gathered information for his regnal list from local scribes, though did not believe they were trustworthy or that his regnal list was complete.
- A Voyage to Abyssinia (1814) by Henry Salt. After the joint reign of Abreha and Atsbeha, Salt's list diverges from Dillmann's list A/Rossini's list C and instead matches list B from both historians.
- Voyage en Abyssinie (Volume 3) by Edmond Combes and Maurice Tamisier (1838). Combes and Tamisier included two lists for the period from Menelik to Bazen. The first list is similar to James Bruce's list except it omits two rulers who reigned before Bazen, while the second list is similar to Henry Salt's list except it replaces Handadyo's name with "Zagdur" used by Bruce and mistakenly gives Gasyo 4 months of rule. Combes and Tamisier's list from Bazen to Abreha and Atsbeha is almost identical to Salt's list, including moving Abreha and Atsbeha's reign much earlier, except that Zegen and Rema (no. 39 and 40) are mistakenly counted as one ruler.
- Reise in Abyssinien (Volume 2) by Eduard Rüppell (1840). His list begins with Bazen and dates the period from the birth of Christ to the reign of Gebre Meskel as 5500 to 6214 A.M. (up to the year 714 on the Gregorian calendar). (Note: Referred to as list "A3" by Dillmann.) His list then continues in a way that matches the "List B" recorded by both Dillmann and Rossini.
- The first of two manuscripts held in the British Museum published in E. A. Wallis Budge's A History of Ethiopia: Nubia and Abyssinia Volume I (1928). This manuscript was filed under Oriental No. 821, fol. 28b. Budge did not quote any names before Ebna El-Hakim or after Abreha and Atsbeha.
- A list of kings provided by E. A. Wallis Budge which he dated to the period c. 360–550 from the end of Abreha and Atsbeha's joint reign to the beginning of Gabra Maskal's reign. Budge was unclear on the source of his information, and appears to combine information from different lists into this one. He believed these monarchs were "kinglets" who ruled parts of Ethiopia separate from other lines of kings between 360 and 480.

Mariano Vittori preceded his list with naming Cush and Ham of the Bible. James Bruce's list begins with Menelik rather than Arwe.

This list uses the prefix "Ela" for most rulers from number 48 to 83. Salt adds the prefix "Za" for most rulers from Arwe to Hadus, except Menelik I, Awda, Kawuda, Kanazi, Haduna and Herka, the last instead having the "El" prefix. Combes' and Tamisier's uses the prefix "Za" for all rulers except Arwe, Makeda and Menelik, as well as Awida, Kanazi, Haduna and Bazen on their second list. Manuscript Oriental No. 821, fol. 28b quoted by Budge uses the "Za" prefix for all rulers except Ebna El-Hakim, and the co-regents Bezta and Zemare. Additionally, on this manuscript all names from Asgwagwa to Ahywa (except for Besi Sawesa, Wakana and Hadus) have the "Ela" prefix as well.

A noticeable problem with this list is that over 400 years pass between the end of Bazen's reign and the beginning of Abreha and Atsbeha's reign. This pushes their joint reign to the early 5th century, a whole century after the traditional early 4th century date for the Christianisation of Ethiopia. Because of this, Henry Salt deliberately altered the placement of Abreha and Atsbeha on his list so that the thirteenth year of their joint reign would fall correctly on the date when Christianity was introduced to Ethiopia instead of contradicting this tradition. Salt noted that his list makes a "very striking error" by placing Abreha after El Ahiawya and thus suggesting that his thirteenth year of rule took place 465 years after the birth of Christ. As a result, Salt's personal king list alters the order slightly by placing Abreha and Atsbeha much further up the king list (the table below however retains the order of his original source). Salt additionally believed that there should only be one king named Ameda, though his list has two kings of this name.

Salt theorised that the change of prefix from "Za" to "El" after the reign of Za Elasguaga reflected a change of dynasty. He believed that this theory could be confirmed by the short reigns of Za Baesi Tsawesa, Za Wakena and Za Hadus, who all reigned for a combined total of 1 year, 4 months and 2 days after the first "El" king, El Herka. He believed that the "Za" kings were the "shepherd kings" or "original Ethiopians" before being replaced by a new "race" of kings. Salt suggested that this change may have been caused by colony of Syrians who were placed by Alexander the Great near the mouth of the Red Sea according to an account written by Philostorgius.

#	Name	Alternate names	Reign length	Notes
BCE era
1	Arwe	"The Serpent"	400 years	Missing from Páez's and Budge's lists.; A tradition recorded by E. A. Wallis Budge claimed that "20 or 30 kings" descended from Arwe ruled in Tigray for 400 years.
2	Angabo	Be'esi Angabo; Agubo; Agabo; Za-Bize	200 years	Vittori's list claims Angabo was a brother of Arwe, but nonetheless states he killed Arwe.; Missing from Páez's and Budge's lists.; French historian Albert Kammerer theorised the name "Angabo" was the name of a tribe or dynasty rather than only one person.
3	Gedur	Zagdur	100 years	Reigned in "Nuh" or "Nuch".; Vittori's list claims both Gedur and Sebado were brothers of Angabo, and that they ruled together for 100 years, followed by Gedur ruling by himself for 50 years. Vittori adds that Gedur was a "strong and famous warrior".; Missing from Páez's and Budge's lists.
4	Sebado	Sebatzo; Sabasa; Sabaso; Sabaha; Sabanut; Zazebass Besedo	50 years	Reigned in "Sado".; Reigned for 50 years in Aksum and 50 years in Sado according to some versions of this list.; Missing from Páez's and Budge's lists.
5	Qawasya	Tawasya	1 year	Reigned in Axum.; Missing from Vitorri's list.; Missing from Páez's and Budge's lists.
6	Makeda	"Queen of the South"; Nicaula; Azeb	50 years 40 years 78 years	According to both Dillmann and Rossini, she came to power in the 36th year of Saul's reign and travelled to Jerusalem in the 4th year of Solomon's reign. On Dillmann's list she reigned 25 years in Ethiopia after returning from Jerusalem.; On Rossini's list she reigned 50 years before her journey and 28 years after.; Both Vittori and Páez stated she came to power in the thirty-seventh year of Saul's reign instead of the thirty-sixth. According to Vittori she reigned in Ethiopia for 27 years, while Páez said she reigned 25 years after returning from Jerusalem.; Not mentioned on Budge's list.
7	Menelik	Ebna El-Hakim; Ibn-al-Hakim; Ibn' Hakim; David	25 years 24 years 29 years 4 years	Son of Makeda and Solomon.; His regnal name was David according to the Kebra Nagast.; Reigned for 2, 24, 26, 28, 29, 30 or 69 years according to various lists.; Sent to Jerusalem by his mother when he was fourteen years old to his father according to Vittori.; James Bruce dated the Menelik's reign to 986–982 BC.
8	Handadyo	Andedo; Handedya; Heudeida	1 year 8 years	Bruce identifies this king with Zagdur, who appears on Rossini's lists B, D and E. This alternate name also appears on Combes' and Tamisier's second list. August Dillmann believed the name "Hendedya, or Zagdur" was simply an opinion expressed by Bruce based on supposition.
9	Awda Amat	Auda; Awida; Awada; Aweda	11 years	Missing from Páez's list.
10	Awseyo	Guaasio; Ausyi; Awesyo	3 years	
11	Sawe	Sawe'e; Zaugua	31 years 3 years 34 years 41 years 44 years	
12	Gasyo	Gaasio; Gefaya; Gesiou	½ a day 4 months 15 years	Reigned "until noon".; Dillmann believed the name "Gefaya" and reign length of 15 years for this king was a corruption on Bruce's list.
*	Katar		15 years	Additional name on James Bruce's list. Replicated on Combes' and Tamisier's first list.
13	Mawat	Awtet; Autet; Mouta	8 years and 4 months 8 years (only); 8 years and 1 month 20 years 20 years and 1 month 21 years 61 years	The differences in reign lengths for this king could be partially explained by the similarities of the Geʽez numbers 8 (፰) and 20 (፳) for the years and the numbers 1 (፩) and 4 (፬) for the months.
14	Bahas	Bahaza; Bahse	9 years	Possibly the same king as Bassyo on list B.
15	Qawda	Tawda; Chauada; Kawida; Kawuda; Taweda	2 years	
16	Qanaz	Chanze; Kanaza; Kanazi	10 years 7 years	
17	Haduna	Hadena; Enduz; Endur; Katzina	9 years 2 years	
18	Wazha	Oezho; Guazha; Wazeha; Wasih; Wanha	1 year	
19	Hadir	Hadina; Heduna; Hadena; Endrati; Endrah; Hazer; Za-dir	2 years 1 year 4 years 6 years	
20	Kalas	Chaales; Kanaz; Kal'aku	6 years 7 years	Omitted from Salt's list and Combes' and Tamisier's second list.; The similarities of the Geʽez numbers 6 (፮) and 7 (፯) could explain the different reign lengths recorded in various sources.
21	Satyo	Setiia; Solaya	16 years 17 years	Omitted from Salt's list and Combes' and Tamisier's second list.; The similarities of the Geʽez numbers 16 (፲፮) and 17 (፲፯) could explain the different reign lengths recorded in various sources.
22	Filya	Safelya; Sapheeliia; Falaya	27 years 26 years 66 years	Omitted from Salt's list and Combes' and Tamisier's second list.; The similarities of the Geʽez numbers 26 (፳፮) and 27 (፳፯) could explain the different reign lengths recorded in various sources.
23	Aglebu	Amalub; Aglubu; Aglibou	3 years	Omitted from Salt's list and Combes' and Tamisier's second list.
24	Ausena	Awsina; Asisena; Azonena	1 year	
25	Birwas	Beriwas; Breguas; Zebuoas; Brus	29 years 19 years 69 years	Omitted from Combes' and Tamisier's first list.
26	Mahsi	Guaase; Mahesi; Mohesa; Magassi; Mahele	1 year	Omitted from Combes' and Tamisier's first list.
*	Be'esi Leugua		17 years	Additional name included on Marianus Victorius' list.
27	Be'esi-Bazen	Baazena; Elhewa; Beeselengua; Bazen	17 years 16 years 12 years 27 years	Christ was born in the 8th year of this king's reign.; At least one version of the list stated that the kings of Axum had reigned for 1,088 years at the time of Christ's birth, but Dillmann noted this calculation was clearly incorrect.; The similarities of the Geʽez numbers 16 (፲፮) and 17 (፲፯) could explain the different reign lengths recorded in various sources.
CE era
*	Candace			Vitorri includes the story of the Ethiopian eunuch and the Biblical queen Candace of Meroe at this point in his list. He states that the eunuch was baptised by Philip the Evangelist in the year 10 CE and that the queen came from the region of Lasta. This queen is otherwise absent from other versions of this list.
28	Sartu	Za-Senatu; Seretu	27 years 26 years 67 years	Missing from Vitorri's list.; The similarities of the Geʽez numbers 26 (፳፮) and 27 (፳፯) could explain the different reign lengths recorded in various sources.
29	La'as	Lekas; Leas; Les; Lacasa	10 years	Missing from Vitorri's list.
30	Masenh	Masenqo; Mesne; Museneh	6 years 7 years	The similarities of the Geʽez numbers 6 (፮) and 7 (፯) could explain the different reign lengths recorded in various sources.
31	Satwa	Satuwa; Shetet; Seteio; Sectua; Sutuwa	9 years	
32	Adgala	Adgela; Za-Adgaba; Adegala; Adgasa	10 years and 7 months 10 years and 6 months 10 years and 2 months 10 years and 4 months 10 years (only); 10 years and 10 months 16 years and 6 months	
33	Agba	Agueba; Agabos	6 months 7 months 2 years and 2 months 6 years	
34	Malis	Melis; Masis; Mali; Malik	7 years 6 years 4 years 4 months	
*				A duplication of number 43 (Ela Azguague) appears here on one manuscript with 67 years of rule.
35	Haqle	Elherka Za-haqli; Akle; Hakale; Hakeli	13 years 14 years	Salt noted that this king, "Za Hakale", could be Zoskales mentioned in the Periplus of the Erythraean Sea. Rüppell agreed and dated his reign to c. 83 AD.
36	Demahe	Didima; Demati	10 years	
37	Awtet		2 years	
38	Ela Awda	Elalad; Alda "Za Elawda"; El-Aweda	30 years	
39	Zegen and Rema (co-rulers)	Zegin and Rema; Zeghin and Rama; Zegen and Zarema; Gizen (only); Bezta and Zemare	8 years 4 years (together); 4 years (Rema) and 8 years (Zegen); 3 years 20 years (each?); 40 years	Both rulers are missing from one version of this list.; Rüppell believed that 'Remha' and 'Za-Zigen' were one person who reigned for 4 years. He also believed that Salt's reign length of 40 years was an error.; Rema is missing from Combes and Tamisier's list.
40	Zegen and Rema (co-rulers)	Zegin and Rema; Zeghin and Rama; Zegen and Zarema; Gizen (only); Bezta and Zemare	8 years 4 years (together); 4 years (Rema) and 8 years (Zegen); 3 years 20 years (each?); 40 years	Both rulers are missing from one version of this list.; Rüppell believed that 'Remha' and 'Za-Zigen' were one person who reigned for 4 years. He also believed that Salt's reign length of 40 years was an error.; Rema is missing from Combes and Tamisier's list.
41	Gafale	Garale; Gafele; Za-Kafal	1 year	Vittori stated his number of years was "uncertain".
42	Be'esi Sarq	Bese Serch; Bese Sare; Za-Beezi; Basi Serk	4 years 14 years	"Whom they say came from the East", according to Vittori's list.
43	Ela Azguagua	Azguag "El Guak"	77 years 76 years	Rüppell believed this name, "El Guak", did not refer to a single king but rather an entire dynasty whose individual rulers are not named and that the old dynasty was restored afterwards.
44	Ela Herka	El-Haris; Ark; Hherc	21 years	Possibly Bagamay from Dillmann's list C/Rossini's list A.
45	Be'esi Saweza	Tzawira; Besesne; Bese Saue; Za-Baesi	1 year 1 year and 6 months 1 month 6 months 3 years and 2 months	Reigned for one lunar month according to Vitorri.
46	Wakana	Wakena; Wakna; Guachena	1 day 2 days 24 days (Note: Rüppell stated the reign was "1/15th" of a year.)	Dillmann noted at least one list stated this ruler reigned for one month.
47	Hadaws	Hadas; Hades; Hadawesa	4 months 2 months 9 months 1 month	
48	Ela Sagal	Asgel; Saghel	3 years 3 years and 4 months 2 years	
49	Ela Asfeha	Asfe; Asfaha; El-Asfa; Alabech	14 years 10 years	Missing from at least one version of this list.
50	Ela Segab	Askabu; Azgheba; El Tsegaba	23 years	
51	Ela Samara	Samra; Samura	3 years	E. A. Wallis Budge theorised that this king could be equated with Sembrouthes, although this king ruled for at least 24 years according to an inscription found at Dekemhare. Rüppell dated the end of this king's reign to 282 AD/5782 AM, based on the Abyssinian dating of the creation of the world to 5500 BC.
52	Ela Ayba	Atiba	17 years 16 years	Name missing from Budge's list but reign length recorded.; The similarities of the Geʽez numbers 16 (፲፮) and 17 (፲፯) could explain the different reign lengths recorded in various sources.
53	Ela Eskendi	Sara-Din; Sthenden; Eskandi; Ela Asgade; Eskander	37 years 36 years	Rüppell theorised this king could have been Abreha, based on the traditional dating for the Christianisation of Axum in 333 AD/5833 A.M..
54	Ela Saham	Ela Sahan; Zacham; El Tshemo; Tzahem	9 years 1 year	
55	Ela San	La-San	13 years 12 years 39 years 53 years	Rüppell believed this king was Ezana because the date 356 AD/5856 AM would fall during this king's reign if all reign lengths were correct. This was the year that Constantius II sent a letter to Ezana asking him to replace Frumentius with Theophilos the Indian because the latter supported Arianism.
56	Ela Ayga	Adaga; Igga	18 years 13 years	
57	Al Ameda	Alamida; Amda	30 years and 8 months 30 years (only); 18 years and 1 month 30 years and 1 month 30 years and 6 months 40 years and 8 months	Possibly the historical Axumite king Ousanas.
*	Wochen		10 years	Additional name on Rüppell's list.
58	Ela Ahyawa	Acheot; Achiuua; Aheyeo; El-Hawaya	3 years	An unpublished history of the kings of Axum states that a queen named "Ahiyewa" was the mother of Abreha and Atsbeha and she ruled for three years during the minority of her sons. This confirms that the ruler named "Ahywa" who preceded Abreha and Atsbeha in this line of succession was a queen who ruled as regent during their minority. If Abreha and Atsbeha can be identified with the historical Ezana and Saizana, as Henry Salt did in his list, then this suggests that "Ahywa" is another name for Sofya, wife of Ousanas. A book titled Gedle Abreha and Asbeha from the Church of Abreha wa-Atsbeha confirms that "Sofya" was one of the names for the mother of Abreha and Atsbeha. The first British Museum manuscript quoted by Budge however stated that "'Eguālā 'Anbasā" was the name of their mother despite also listing "Ahywa" as their predecessor.
Christian era
59	Ela Abreha and Atsbeha (co-rulers)	Ela Abreha and Asbeha "Eguala Anbasa" ("Sons of the Lion"); Abraha and Azba; Asfaha and Mahan Abreha; Arbeha and Asbeha	27 years and 6 months 26 years and 6 months 26 years (only); 27 years (only)	Vittori's list states that Christianity spread throughout Ethiopia after the seventeenth year of their reign.; According to at least one list, Christianity came to Axum in the thirteenth year of the reign of Abreha and Atsbeha, in the year 425. This however contradicts the historical fact that the historical Axumite king Ezana converted to the religion in the early fourth century. Páez's list adds the epithet "Guiders of Clarity".; Henry Salt moved this joint reign to between El Semera (51) and El Aiba (52) and identified Abreha and Atsbeha with the historical Ezana and Saizana. He moved this reign because it allowed for the thirteenth year to coincide with the year 333 CE, which some chronicles state was when Christianity was introduced to Ethiopia.; Rüppell noted that one chronicle dated Abreha's death to 430 years after the birth of Christ, 5930 A.M..; The manuscript quoted by Budge states that their mother was named Eguala Anbasa. However, at least one other list instead claims the name "Eguala Anbasa" was an epithet meaning "Sons of the Lion".
60	Ela Abreha and Atsbeha (co-rulers)	Ela Abreha and Asbeha "Eguala Anbasa" ("Sons of the Lion"); Abraha and Azba; Asfaha and Mahan Abreha; Arbeha and Asbeha	27 years and 6 months 26 years and 6 months 26 years (only); 27 years (only)	
*	Tesmul Ukal Amed		27 years	Additional name on Rüppell's list.; Dillmann believed this name was an erroneous misreading by Rüppell.
*	Ela Atsbeha (Sole rule)	Atzbeha-ela-Abreha	12 years	Some lists instead have Abreha ruling by himself for 12 years.; According to Vittori, Abreha ruled alone for 14 years after the death of "Azba" (Atsbeha).; Salt does not mention any sole rule by either brother on his list.; Rüppell listed a ruler named "Abreha the Second" at this point reigning for 9 years.
61	Ela Asfeha	Asfa; Asfaha	7 years 6 years 3 years 5 years	The similarities of the Geʽez numbers 6 (፮) and 7 (፯) could explain the different reign lengths recorded in various sources.
62	Ela Sahel	Sahal	14 years 17 years	Budge claimed that this king co-ruled with his two brothers Ela Abreha and Ela Asbeha from 356 to 370, and that they divided each day into three equal parts in which each brother was the absolute ruler during one part. This story appears to be lifted from Pedro Páez, who included this statement on the first of three lists he quoted. However Páez's list did not include reign lengths and more closely matched Rossini's list D, rather than Rossini's list C. Páez was also referring to three kings named Asfeha, Arfed and Amsi, the latter two not appearing on Rossini list C/Dillmann list A, suggesting that Budge equated the three kings with three kings from this list.
63	Ela Adhana	Atana	14 years	
64	Ela Rete'e	Reth; Eretana; Rete'a	1 year 4 years	
65	Asfeh	Asfa; Asfaha	1 year 5 years	
66	Ela Atsbeha	Asfaha; Azba; Asbaha; Asbeha	5 years 16 years 17 years	
67	Ela Ameda	Alhamedan	16 years 17 years 6 years 7 years	Identified by Rüppell with the historical Axumite king Aphilas and dated to 542 AD/6042 A.M. based on the belief that this king fought the Himyarites. Most historians believed this king was actually Kaleb, but Rüppell rejected this idea because of Kaleb's reign is placed much later on the regnal lists. He further theorised that the short reigns of the next 2 kings was due to them being usurpers who took the throne while he was away at war, or shortly after he died.
68	Ela Abreha	Abra; Abraha	6 months 7 months 2 months 2 years	
69	Ela Sahel	Esahel; Shahel	2 months 6 months	Rüppell believed this king was referred in the works of Procopius, who wrote that an Axumite king named Hellesthaeus was succeeded by his nephew Angane, who was soon ousted by a slave from Adulis named Abreha. Rüppell identified Hellesthaeus with Ameda, Angane with Sahel, and Abreha with Gabaz below.
70	Ela Gabaz	Ghebuz; Egabes; Ela Gabaz and Ela Adhana (joint rule); Gaboz	2 years 1 year 3 years 12 years 14 years	Reign dated to c. 392 by Budge. Budge noted a story about this king in which he killed his predecessor, married by force a princess named Admas and proclaimed himself king. He then married a pagan queen named Lab from a neighbouring district. A brother of Queen Admas rose up and killed Ela Gabaz and Queen Lab and became king afterwards.
71	Ela Sehul	Sekul; Esahel; Shahel; Sehal	1 year 4 years	Rüppell theorised this was the same person as number 69 above.; Budge instead believed this was a different king and dated his reign to c. 394.
72	Ela Asbah	Asfaha; Azba; Izbah	3 years 5 years 2 years	Omitted from Budge's retelling of events during the period of 356–480.
73	Ela Abreh and Ela Adhana (co-rulers)	Abra and Adakana; Arbeha and Adhana	16 years	Missing from Rüppell's list.
74	Ela Abreh and Ela Adhana (co-rulers)	Abra and Adakana; Arbeha and Adhana	16 years	Missing from Rüppell's list.
75	Ela Saham	Zaham	28 years 18 years	Missing from Rüppell's list.
76	Ela Amida		12 years 17 years	Missing from Rüppell's list.
77	Ela Sahel	Sahan; Shahel	2 years	Missing from Rüppell's list.
78	Ela Sebah	Azba	2 years	Missing from Rüppell's list.
79	Ela Saham	Sa Ghemo; Zaham; Zahan	15 years	
80	Ela Gabaz	Gabez; Gabes; Gobaz	21 years 24 years	
81	Agabe and Levi (co-rulers)	"Gale Walewi"; Agabe and Lewi	4 years 2 years	Missing from at Vittori's list.; Recorded as one person named "Gale Walewi" on Rüppell's list.; Joint reign dated to c. 474–475 by Budge.
82	Agabe and Levi (co-rulers)	"Gale Walewi"; Agabe and Lewi	4 years 2 years	Missing from at Vittori's list.; Recorded as one person named "Gale Walewi" on Rüppell's list.; Joint reign dated to c. 474–475 by Budge.
83	Ela Amida		11 years 14 years	Missing from Vittori's list.; Budge believed this king was Alla Amidas who reigned when the Nine Saints came to Ethiopia.
84	Yaqob and Dawit (co-rulers)	"Jakob Oeled Dauit"	3 years 30 years	"Brothers" according to Vittori.; Recorded as one person named "Jakob Oeled Dauit" who reigned for 30 years by Rüppell.
85	Yaqob and Dawit (co-rulers)	"Jakob Oeled Dauit"	3 years 30 years	"Brothers" according to Vittori.; Recorded as one person named "Jakob Oeled Dauit" who reigned for 30 years by Rüppell.
86	Armah		14 years, 7 months and 8 days 14 years and 6 months 14 years, 6 months and 8 days 14 years, 6 months and 10 days 14 years, 7 months and 7 days 14 years (only)	Reign dated to 489–503 by Budge.
87	Zitana	Seza Sinka; Zittahana	2 years 12 years	Reign dated to 504–505 by Budge.; Father of Kaleb (Constantinos) according to some Ethiopian sources.
88	Yaqob	Jacob	9 years 12 years	Budge recorded a story about this king in which he was said to be a cruel and wicked king who was sometimes called "Arwe" (i.e. "Beast" or "Serpent") and he was defeated by Ella Asbeha or Elesbaan, who slew him after trapping him and forcing him to leap through fire to escape.
89	Constantinos	Quastantinos	28 years 29 years	Called "Kaleb or Kustantinos" on Rüppell's list. Budge likewise identified him with Kaleb, as well as the name Ella Asbeha used in some sources.; Son of Zitana according to Budge.; Reign dated to 514–542 by Budge.
90	Beta Esrael		8 months 1 month 14 years	Most lists do not provide the number of months he ruled.; Missing from Páez's list.; Son of Kaleb/Constantinos and governor of Adwa during his father's reign according to Budge.; Rüppell dated the end of this king's reign to 6200 AM/700 AD.
91	Gabra Masqal	Gabra Maschel; Gebra Masgal	14 years	Son of Kaleb/Constantinos according to Budge.; Reign dated to c. 550 by Budge.; Rüppell dated the end of this king's reign to 6214 AM/714 AD due to Lik Atkum's chronicle, which stated that 700 years passed between the birth of Christ and reign of Gabra Maskal.
*	Nalek		11 years	Additional name included on Marianus Victorius' list. Dillmann doubted the accuracy of this name placement.
*	Nake and Bazen (co-rulers)		17 years	Additional reign on Páez's list. The list states that the Church of Axum was founded in their reign.

Frederick Edwards noted the rulers numbered 3 to 5 on this list do not appear on Rossini's other lists, unless they can be equated with Zagdur, Subabasyu and Tawasya on list D, where they follow Menelik.

=== Dillmann List B / Rossini List B ===
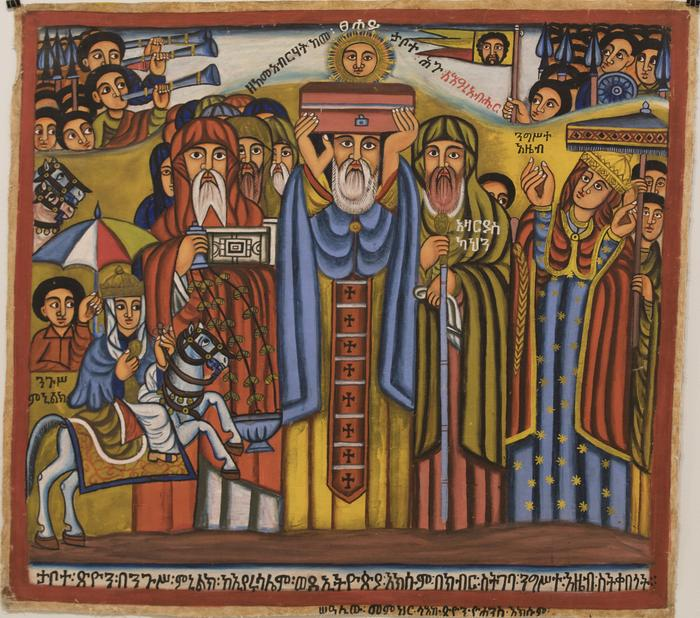
Menelik I bringing the Zion Tabot (Ark of the Covenant) to Aksum.

August Dillmann's list B and Carlo Conti Rossini's list B both contain 69 names from Menelik I (known as "Ibn-Hakim" on this list) to Dil Na'od, the last ruler of the Kingdom of Axum.

This list does not contain reign lengths for most monarchs. The list should cover a period of roughly 2,000 years from the 10th century BCE to the 10th century CE, but the lack of dates makes it difficult to accurately map the number of rulers over this time period.

Dillmann's list B is compiled from four different collected lists, the same ones used for his list A. Rossini's list B is based on 33 documents dating to the 16th–19th centuries. These include the Gadla Takla Haymanot and chronicles held in the British Museum, Bodleian Library and Bibliothèque nationale de France.

Each ruler is stated to be the son of the preceding king. Some variations of the list specifically call these rulers the "Kings of Axum".

Henry Salt believed the kings from Alla Amidas to Dil Na'od reigned for a total of 354 years. E. A. Wallis Budge dated the period from Constantinos to Del Na'ad to c. 600–970.

Apart from Dillmann's and Rossini's lists, the following table includes information from these sources:

- A Voyage to Abyssinia (1814) by Henry Salt. Salt's list prior to Abreha and Atsbeha closely follows Dillmann's list A/Rossini's list C, but after this point it more closely follows list B from both historians. However, Salt also quoted a "corrupt" list for the period from Ibn Hakim to Bazen that is similar to list B below. Edmond Combes and Maurice Tamisier's list in Voyage en Abyssinie (Volume 3) (1838) is virtually the same as Salt's list except for minor differences of name spellings.
- Reise in Abyssinien (Volume 2) by Eduard Rüppell (1840). His list of rulers before Gebre Meskel matches Dillmann's List A/Rossini's List C, while afterwards it matches the "List B" recorded by both Dillmann and Rossini.
- Études sur l'histoire d'Éthiopie (1882) by French Orientalist René Basset. This list claimed that each king was the son of the previous king, except for Saba Asgad, who was the brother of his predecessor Zaray and both were sons of Sarguay.
- A translation of The Life of Takla Haymanot by E. A. Wallis Budge (1906). Each king is the son of the previous king on this list.
- The second of two manuscripts held in the British Museum published in E. A. Wallis Budge's A History of Ethiopia: Nubia and Abyssinia Volume I (1928). This manuscript was filed under Oriental No. 821, fol. 36a. Budge regarded this manuscript to be the most authoritative.

#	Name	Alternate names	Notes
BCE era
1	Ibna-Hakim	Menelik	Son of Solomon.
2	Tomai	Tomay; Tamaya; Tomas; Tomada	Combined with the following ruler as "Tomai Zagdur" on Salt's 'corrupt' list. Ethiopian form of the name Thomas. Son of Menelik I.
3	Za Gedur	Zagdur	No. 3 on Dillmann's list A under the name Gedur.
4	Aksumay	Axumai; Aksumaya	
5	Awseyo	Awsabyos; Awsayo	Missing from Salt's 'corrupt' list.; No. 10 on Dillmann's list A.; The list recorded in The Life of Takla Haymanot stated that "forty generations" since Adam passed with the reign of this king.
6	Tahawasya		No. 5 in Dillmann's list A under the name Qawasya.
7	Abralyus	Abrelyus	An alternate name for "Abraham".
8	Warada Sahay	Wurred-Sai; Warada Dahaya; Warada Dahay	According to both Rossini and Basset, this name means "the Sun has descended". Budge theorised this name may indicate a former belief in a "Stellar religion".
9	Handeyo	Handadyo; Handor; Handodea; Andedo; Endor	No. 8 on Dillmann's list A.
10	Warada Nagash	Warada Nagas; Wurred Negush; Warada Nagasha; Warada Nagasha	
11	Awseya	Ausanya; Awesya	
12	Elalyon	Elsae Seyon; Elalior	
13	Toma Seyon	Toma Zion; Toma Sahay; Tomas Dahay	Name means "Twin of Zion".; The name "Tomas Dahay" on the manuscript quoted by Budge could be a mistaken combination of Toma Seyon and Warada Dahay.
14	Basyo	Gasyo; Baselyos; Basilius	No. 12 on Dillmann's list A under the name Gasyo.
15	Awtet	Awetet	Budge identified this king with Mawat in Dillmann's list A/Rossini's list C.; The list recorded in The Life of Takla Haymanot stated that "fifty generations" since Adam passed with the reign of this king.
16	Zaware Nebrat	Zaware (only)	
17	Sayfay	Saifai; Scifi; Safaya; Safay	
18	Ramhay	Rami; Ramhaya	
19	Hande	Artse; Handu	
20	Safelya	Suffelia; Safalya	No. 22 on Dillmann's list A under the name Filya.
21	Aglebul	Agbul; Aglebel	No. 23 on Dillmann's list A under the name Aglebu.
22	Bawawel	Bawaul	
23	Bawaris		No. 25 on Dillmann's list A under the name Beriwas
24	Mahase	Mahasi	No. 26 on Dillmann's list A under tha name Mahsi.
25	Nalke	Hanke; Naque	The list recorded in The Life of Takla Haymanot stated that "sixty generations" since Adam passed with the reign of this king.
26	Bazen	Tazen	Jesus Christ was born in the eighth year of his reign. "in his days was born our Lord Jesus Christ, to whom be glory, in the eighth year of the reign of this king".
CE era
27	Senfa Ared	Senfa Arad	
28	Bahr Asgad	Bahr Asged; Bahar Asgad; Baher Asgad	
29	Germa Sor		Some versions of this list swap the order of these two names. Germa Sor is omitted altogether on some versions of the list, including Basset's and Budge's lists.
30	Germa Asfare	Germa Sofar	Some versions of this list swap the order of these two names. Germa Sor is omitted altogether on some versions of the list, including Basset's and Budge's lists.
31	Sarguay	Sargue; Shargaya; Sharguay	
32	Zaray	Zaraya	
33	Saba Asgad	Sabe Asgad	
34	Seyon Geza	Zion Geza	
35	Agdur		No. 35 on Rossini's list B.; The list recorded in The Life of Takla Haymanot stated that "seventy generations" since Adam passed with the reign of this king.
36	Saifa Ared	Sayfa Ared; Senfa Ared; Sayafa Arad; Senfa Arad	No. 34 on Rossini's list B.; According to some chronicles, he was the father of Abreha and Atsbeha.
Christian era
37	Abreha and Atsbeha (joint rule)	Abreha and Asbeha	According to Dillmann's list, Aba Salama came to Ethiopia during the reign of these kings. At the time the people of Ethiopia were worshiping "the serpent", while some were following Mosaic law. Aba Salama taught them the message of Jesus Christ and performed miracles. The Ethiopians became believers in the year 340. Also according to this list, Abreha and Atsbeha built the city of Axum. The list recorded in The Life of Takla Haymanot also includes a similar statement.; Basset's list includes a similar statement but instead dates the Christianisation of Ethiopia to the year 333.
38	Abreha and Atsbeha (joint rule)	Abreha and Asbeha	
*	Abreha (sole rule)		
39	Asfeha	Asfeh; Asfah	Salt stated these four rulers reigned for a total of 32 years. Though he personally felt that it was more likely they reigned for a total of 70 years. Combes and Tamisier instead claimed that Asfeha reigned for 3 years and did not give reign lengths to any of his successors.
40	Arfed	Afrad; Arfoud	Salt stated these four rulers reigned for a total of 32 years. Though he personally felt that it was more likely they reigned for a total of 70 years. Combes and Tamisier instead claimed that Asfeha reigned for 3 years and did not give reign lengths to any of his successors.
41	Amsi	Hamose; Amosi; Khamsi	Salt stated these four rulers reigned for a total of 32 years. Though he personally felt that it was more likely they reigned for a total of 70 years. Combes and Tamisier instead claimed that Asfeha reigned for 3 years and did not give reign lengths to any of his successors.
42	Saladoba	Saaldoba; Aladoba; Sela-Doba; Sa'al Doba	Salt stated these four rulers reigned for a total of 32 years. Though he personally felt that it was more likely they reigned for a total of 70 years. Combes and Tamisier instead claimed that Asfeha reigned for 3 years and did not give reign lengths to any of his successors.
43	Al-Ameda	Alameda; Aminadab; Ameda (only); Amda	Both Dillmann's and Basset's list state the Nine Saints came to Ethiopia during this king's reign. This is also recorded in the list included with The Life of Takla Haymanot.; At least one version of this list instead claims this took place in the reign of the previous king Saladoba.; According to both the Gedle Aregawi and Gedle Pentelewon, this king was the son of Saladoba, and the latter explicitly states Saladoba was the sixth king after Abreha and Atsbeha.
44	Tazena		Son of Alla Amidas according to some sources.
45	Kaleb		According to both Dillmann's and Basset's lists, he "divided the country". The list included with The Life of Takla Haymanot said Kaleb "rent the earth". E. A. Wallis Budge explained that some legends state that Kaleb "split the earth", and refer to when he tried to go to Arabia but had no ships to cross the Red Sea. Abba Pantalewon then prayed to God, who split the earth to allow Kaleb to travel under the sea until he came to Mount Sinai. He then travelled to Himyar and fought a battle in which he won and established Aksumite authority over Arabia.
46	Gabra Masqal	Guebra Mascal	Yared composed hymns during this king's reign according to both Dillmann's and Basset's lists.; The list included with The Life of Takla Haymanot also mentioned this, and added that Gabra Maskal "[built] Damo, which is the place of Aragawi, our father" and that "eighty generations" since Adam passed with the reign of this king.; Combes and Tamisier's list added the epithet "Peace to you, glorious king, who triumphs in the power of the Lord, Guebra-Mascal, victor and ruler of enemies".
47	Constantinos	Quastantinos; Kustantinos; Kuostantinos	
48	Wasan Asgad	Wusen Segued; Wasan Saged; Wasna Sagad	One version of this list states he was Gabra Masqal's son instead of the son of Constantinos.
49	Fere Sanay	Fre Sennai; Fare Sanai; Fere Shanaya; Fere Shanay	
50	Aderaz	Ader'azar; Addiarae; Deras; Daraz	According to Alaqa Taye, this king was Najashi, the Axumite king who reigned at the time of the Muslim Migration to Abyssinia.; Dillmann suggested this was a version of the name Andreas.
51	Ekla Udem	Ekla Wedem; Akul Woodem; Ekele Wedem; Akla Wudem; Akla Wedem	
52	Germa Safar	Grim Sofer; Gherma Safer	
53	Zergaz	Gergaz; Sergas	Dillmann suggested this was a version of the name Cyriacus.
54	Degna Michael	Degena Mikael	
55	Bahr Ekla	Bakr-Akla; Bahar Ikela	
56	Gum	Gouma	The list recorded in The Life of Takla Haymanot stated that "ninety generations" since Adam passed with the reign of this king.
57	Asguamgum	Asegum; Asguomguem; Asguomgum	
58	Letem		
59	Talatem	Thala-tum	
60	Oda Gosh	Oda Gos; Gadi Gaso; Warada Has; Woddo Gush; Ouoddo-Gouech; Oda Sasa; Oda Gosha	
61	Ayzur	Izoor	Reigned for half a day according to both Dillmann's and Basset's lists, as well as the list included with The Life of Takla Haymanot. According to both Rüppell and Bassett, this king was crushed to death by a large crowd of people on the day of his coronation. Bassett additionally added that many other men died of suffocation and since this incident a barrier has been placed in front of the king during the coronation.
62	Dedem		
63	Wededem	Udedem; Weddem	Omitted from both Salt's and Combes and Tamisier's lists.
64	Wedem Asfare	Udem Asfare; Woodm Asfar	Lived to be 150 years old according to Dillmann's and Basset's lists, as well as the list included with The Life of Takla Haymanot.
65	Armah	Armakha	
66	Degna Djan	Degena Schan; Degnazan	Reigned for 12 years according to at least one version of this list.; The list recorded in The Life of Takla Haymanot stated that "one hundred generations" since Adam passed with the reign of this king.
67	Geda Djan	Degea Schan; Geda Zan; Ged Azan; Degazan; Dema'azan	Omitted from Salt's, Combes and Tamisier's, and Budge's lists.; Reigned for 9 years according to at least one version of this list.; Rossini suggested this king was a duplication of the previous king.
68	Anbasa Wedem	Anbasa Udem; Ambasa Woodim	
69	Del Na'ad	Del Naod; Delnad; Delna'ad	According to this list, he was the last king to rule Axum and the throne was then given to "others who were not Israelites", the Zagwe dynasty. A similar statement is recorded on Basset's list and the list included with The Life of Takla Haymanot.; Reigned for 4 years according to at least one version of this list.; Salt dated this king's overthrow by Gudit to 925 CE. He stated the capital of the country then moved to Lasta.; Combes and Tamisier instead dated his reign to 900 CE, stating that 350 years passed from the reign of Gabra Maskal to Del Naad.; Rüppell noted this king was driven out by a Jewish woman named "Sague" (probably Gudit) and took refuge in Shewa. The name "Sague" refers to the Zagwe dynasty, who Rüppell believed were related to this queen.; The list recorded in The Life of Takla Haymanot stated that "one hundred and two generations" since Adam and "sixty-eight generations" since Menelik I passed with the reign of this king.

=== Dillmann List C / Rossini List A ===
August Dillmann's list C and Carlo Conti Rossini's list A both begin with Bazen and do not name any rulers from the BCE era. Both lists end by naming Terda Gabaz, a princess who passed the throne to the Zagwe dynasty. These lists notably do not name Dil Na'od as the last king of Axum, and place some rulers after his name that preceded him on other lists. Dilmann's list includes 44 names and Rossini's list includes 47 names.

Dillmann noted that his list C could be found in the works of Mariano Vittori and James Bruce.

Rossini's list A was based on 22 documents dating to the 16th–19th centuries. These documents included manuscripts held in the British Museum, Bibliothèque nationale de France, Royal Library of Berlin and Bodleian Library, as well as the private collection of Antoine Thomson d'Abbadie, the Ethiopian manuscripts Serata Mangest, Weddasé Amlak and Kitara Tasbuki, and regnal lists recorded by Mariano Vittorio, Pedro Páez and Manuel de Almeida.

Dillmann's list C begins by stating "In Axum, the serpent had its rule, and after our Redeemer was born, these were the kings of Axum".

Apart from Dillmann's and Rossini's lists, the following table also includes information from these sources:

- Chaldeae seu Aethiopicae linguae institutiones by Mariano Vittori (1552). (Note: Referred to as list "C2" by Dillmann.)
- The third of three regnal lists recorded by Pedro Páez in his book História da Etiópia (1620). Páez believed this list contained the throne names kings took upon their accession, while he thought his first list contained birth names. The third list was placed directly after the second as a continuation of names following Gebre Meskel, however there is a significant overlap of names between the two lists.
- Travels to Discover the Source of the Nile (Volume 2) by James Bruce (1790), from a monastery of Debre Libanos. (Note: Referred to as list "C3" by Dillmann.)

#	Name	Alternate names	Notes
Pre-Christian era
1	Bazen		Missing from Páez's third list but mentioned at the end of his second list which directly preceded it.
2	Senfa Asgad	Senfaghed; Tzenaf Segued	Dillmann considers these rulers to be the same person, but Rossini lists them separately.; Bahr Asgad is missing from James Bruce's list.
3	Bahr Asgad	Bahar Saghed; Bahra Asgad; Bahar Saghed	Dillmann considers these rulers to be the same person, but Rossini lists them separately.; Bahr Asgad is missing from James Bruce's list.
4	Germa Asfar	Guerma Azfare; Ghermaasfer; Garima Asferi	
*	Sefer		Additional name found on a list from the Church of Matara.
5	Sarada	Salaaiuba; Saladoba	Missing from Páez's list.
6	Kuelu Lasyon	Kuelu la Zion; Callulasion; Tzion	
7	Sarguay	Sargue; Sergou; Sargai	
8	Zaray	Zerou	Missing from Bruce's list.
9	Bagamay	Bagahamai	
10	Djan Asgad	Giaanscheda; Zan Asgad; Sena Asgad; Jan Azgued; Jan Segued	
11	Seyon Hegez	Zeoneghiz; Zion Hegez; Syon Heg	
12	Mawa'al Genh	Malghene; Moalgueha; Moal Genha; Ma'albagad; Ma'abar; Malay	
13	Saf Arad	Sayfa Arad; Sepharad; Saif Araad	According to some chronicles, he was the father of Abreha and Atsbeha.
14	Agdor	Agdar; Agder; Agdai; Agedar	
Christian era
15	Abreha and Atsbeha (joint rule)	Abraha and Azbaha	Called "the beloved brothers" on this list.; Vitorri's list does not name them as co-rulers at this point in his list.; Páez's list specifies these rulers were brothers.; Bruce dated their joint reign to 333 CE.
16	Abreha and Atsbeha (joint rule)	Abraha and Azbaha	Called "the beloved brothers" on this list.; Vitorri's list does not name them as co-rulers at this point in his list.; Páez's list specifies these rulers were brothers.; Bruce dated their joint reign to 333 CE.
17	Asfeha	Asfeh; Asfa	Rossini's list states he was a brother of both Arfed and Amsi.
18	Arfed and Amsi (joint rule)	Afrad; Amy; Arphad and Amzi	Vittori's list does not state they were co-rulers.; Páez's list states they were brothers.
19	Arfed and Amsi (joint rule)	Afrad; Amy; Arphad and Amzi	Vittori's list does not state they were co-rulers.; Páez's list states they were brothers.
*	Ahau		Additional name on Vittori's list. However, this name means "brothers" so may be a mistake and initially referred to the previous two rulers.
*	Bamayzan		Additional brother of Asfeha, Arfed and Amsi named on a copy of this list from the Church of Matara.
20	Arad	Arada	
21	Saladoba	Saaldoba; Aladoba; Aladova; Sel Adoba	
22	Alamida		Rossini believed this king was Alla Amidas.
23	Tazena	Tabena; Tezhana	
24	Kaleb	Chaleb; Caleb	Bruce dated this king's reign to 522 CE.
25	Gabra Masqal	Gsbramaschel; Guebra Mascal	
26	Constantinos	Quastantinos; Constantiuus	
27	Bazgar	Zezgar; Bezgar; Bezaagher; Bazzer	
28	Asfeh	Asfah; Asfa; Azbeha	
29	Armah	Armaha	
30	Jan Asfeh	Djan Asfeh; Zan Asfeh; Gianasfa	
31	Jan Asgad	Djan Asgad; Zan Asgad; Jan Azgued; Gianscheda; Jan Segued	
32	Fere Sanay	Fresennai	
33	Aderaz	Adaraz; Adarahaz	
34	Ayzur	Aizor; Adazor; Aizar	James Bruce believed the short reign of Ayzur (recorded on other lists) followed by the accession of Dil Na'od as an infant, as well as an epidemic disease spreading around Axum, all aided Judith (Gudit) in her conquest and usurption of the throne.
35	Del Naod	Del Na'ad; Delnahad; Del Naad	Bruce dated this king's reign to 960 CE.
36	Maday	Ma'eday	
37	Esato / Gudit	Sahata	Dillmann's list states this ruler was "the evil and godless woman" known as Esato in Amhara and Gudit in Tigray. She destroyed and devasted Churches and reigned for 40 years.; Páez's list instead claimed these were two separate women. Esato was a Jewish woman who reigned in Amhara, while Gudit ruled over Tigray for 40 years and destroyed many churches there.; Vitorri's list calls her Sahata and called her "an unjust and sacrilegious woman" who destroyed churches and shrines, and took away all gold and silver from them, and hid them in the ground.; Not included on Rossini's list.
38	Anbasa Wedem	Anbasa Udem; Anbasaudim	
39	Kuala Wedem	Kuala Udem; Galawdewos; Cullaudim; Huala Udem	
40	Germa Asfare	Ghemaasfare	
41	Zergaz	Zemaz; Ger Ga'az; Girgaz	
42	Degna Mikael		
43	Badagaz	Bada Gabaz; Begegaz	
44	Armah	Arma	According to Dillmann's list, after his reign the throne was "robbed by a family that did not belong to the line of David and the people of Israel" (the Zagwe dynasty). The list also quotes Deuteronomy 32:21 and Romans 10:19.; Páez's list also similarly ended here stating that Armah was followed by "Marari, of the family of Zagwe, reigned for fifteen years". The list then continued with Yemrehana Krestos, Lalibela, Na'akueto La'ab (40 years each) and Harbai (8 years). A list of emperors from Yekuno Amlak to Susenyos I then follows.
45	Hezba Anani	Sbinahanni	Appears on Vitorri's and Rossini's lists, but not Dillmann's list.; The Debre Libanos manuscript, which otherwise follows the third list recorded by Páez, names this king as the successor of Armah and the last king to reign before the Zagwe dynasty.
46	Degna Djan	Genagan	Appears on Rossini's list, but not Dillmann's list.
47	Anbasa Wedem		Appears on Rossini's list, but not Dillmann's list.
48	Terdae Gabaz	Tredda Gabez	A princess who passed the throne to the Zagwe dynasty. According to Vittori, she married the ruler of the Bugna province and it was to him that the Ethiopian kingdom was transferred to. He then killed all royal descendants of the "line of David". Vittori states that there were five kings who ruled from "the family of this queen" (i.e. Zagwe dynasty). This tradition suggests that she can be equated with Masoba Warq, a daughter of Dil Na'od, who, according to tradition, was the wife of Mara Takla Haymanot, the founder of the Zagwe dynasty.; Some sources claim this was an alternate name for Gudit.

=== Rossini List D ===
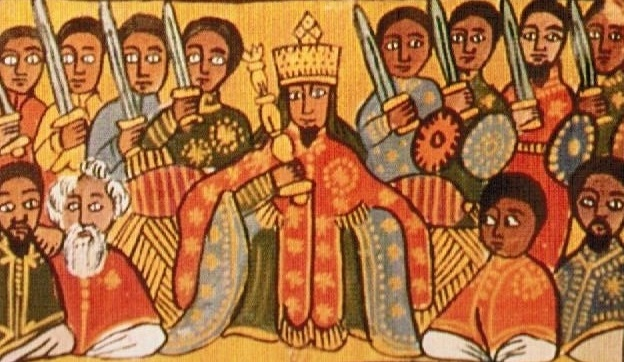
King Angabo, who appears on Rossini's lists C, D, E and F.

Carlo Conti Rossini's list D is based on 6 documents. These include a manuscript from Antoine Thomson d'Abbadie's collection (number 105), the Chronicle of Azaz Delbo, and regnal lists recorded by Melchior da Silva, Pedro Páez and Manuel de Almeida. The list has 67 names from Angabo to Dil Na'od.

All names on this list also appear on Rossini's lists B and C, though some are spelled differently. Like those lists, list D also lacks reign lengths.

Apart from Rossini's list, the following table also includes information from these sources:

- The first of three regnal lists recorded by Pedro Páez (1620). Páez believed this list contained the birth names of the kings while the second and third lists included throne names they took upon their accession.

#	Name	Alternate names	Notes
BCE era
1	Be'esi Angabo	Baren Gabo	Missing from Páez's list. His list instead begins with David and Solomon before Menelik.
2	Menelik		
3	Zagdur	Zabagdur; Zagduru	Son of Menelik according to Páez's list.
4	Subabasyu	Za Baseo	Awseyo on Rossini's list B.
5	Tawasya		
6	Handona	Aderia; Andona; Anderia; Adona	Handadyo on Rossini's lists B and C.
7	Wareza	Waresa	Warada Nagash on Rossini's list B.
8	Awseyo	Ausyo	
9	Masyo		
10	Sawa		
11	Basyo	Gasyo; Baselyos	
12	Awtet		
13	Bahasa		Bahas on Rossini's list C.
14	Sawada	Zawada	
15	Hadena	Adena	
16	Kalas	Kalez; Chaales	
17	Gotya	Gotoba	Satyo on Rossini's list C.
18	Safelya		
19	Elgebul	Elgabul	Agelbul or Aglebu on Rossini's lists B and C.
20	Bawawel		
21	Bawris	Bawarez	Bawaris on Rossini's list B.
22	Awsena		
23	Mahase	Mahasi	
24	Nalkue	Malke	Nalke on Rossini's list B.
25	Bazen		Christ was born in the eighth year of this reign.
CE era
26	Senfa Asgad	Senfa Asgued	
27	Bahr Asgad	Bahar Asgued	
*	Germa Kalez		Additional name recorded on Páez's list.
28	Germa Safer	Germa Asfere	Germa Asfare on Rossini's list A.
29	Serado	Sarado	
30	Kuelu Lasyon		
31	Sarguay	Sargue	
32	Zaray		
33	Sen Asgad	Zarra Asgued	Jan Asgad on Rossini's list A.
34	Syon Hagez		
35	Ma'al Ganah	Mala Agna	Mawa'al Genh on Rossini's list A.
36	Saf Arada		
37	Agdar		
Christian era
38	Abreha and Atsbeha	Abra and Azba	During their reign, Frumentius came from Jerusalem and preached the Holy Gospel. He was later called "Abba Salama".
39	Abreha and Atsbeha	Abra and Azba	During their reign, Frumentius came from Jerusalem and preached the Holy Gospel. He was later called "Abba Salama".
40	Asfeha	Asfa	On Páez's list, these three rulers are described as brothers who divided each day into three parts in which a different brother ruled.
41	Arfed	Arfad	On Páez's list, these three rulers are described as brothers who divided each day into three parts in which a different brother ruled.
42	Amsi		On Páez's list, these three rulers are described as brothers who divided each day into three parts in which a different brother ruled.
43	Arada	Arado; Arad	
*	Aladoba		Additional name recorded on Páez's list. Likely Saladoba from Dillman's and Rossini's list B, and Dillmann's list C/Rossini's list A.
44	Alamida	Amiamid	The Nine Saints came to Tigray during his reign and built many churches there.
45	Tazena		
46	Kaleb		
47	Gabra Masqal		
48	Quastantinos	Constantinos	
49	Bazagar		Budge suggested this king was Wasan Sagad from list B.
50	Asfeh		
51	Armah		Missing from Páez's list.
52	Jan Asfeh	Zan Asfeh	Missing from Páez's list.
53	Jan Sagada	Jan Asgued; Zan Sagada	Jan Asgad from Rossini's list A.
54	Fere Sanay		
55	Adoraz		
56	Ayzar	Aidar	
57	Ma'eday	Maday	
58	Kalawedem		Kuala Wedem from Rossini's list A.
59	Germa Asfar		
60	Zargaz	Zargaza	
61	Degna Mikael		
62	Badagaz	Bada Gabaz	
63	Armah		
64	Hezba Anani	Ezbinani	
65	Degnazan		
66	Anbasa Wedem	Ambasa Wudem	
67	Del Na'ad	Del Naod	Páez's list follows this king with a statement that the kingdom then passed to "another who was not of the seed of David or the house of Israel" named Zagwe. After "many years" it then returned to the line of Israel with Yekuno Amlak. The list then names emperors from Yekuno Amlak to Susenyos I.

=== Rossini List E ===
Carlo Conti Rossini's list E is found in only one manuscript given to him by the Monastery of Enda Sellasé in Akele Guzai in Eritrea. E. A. Wallis Budge quoted this list in his book A History of Ethiopia: Nubia and Abyssinia (Volume 1) (1928). There are 67 names on this list.

This list includes reign lengths for some rulers, but not all of them.

#	Name	Alternate names	Reign length	Notes
BCE era
1	Arwe			
2	Agabos			
3	Makeda			"Queen of the South"
4	Menelik		15 years	
5	Abrakid	Ab-Rakid	15 years	Royal name of Tomay from Rossini's lists B and F.
6	Zagdur	Zabagdur; Zagduru		
7	Aksumay			
8	Awseyo	Awsabyos		
9	Handar	Hanyar		Handadyo from Rossini's lists B and C.
10	Taosya	Ta'asya		Tawasya from Rossini's lists B and D.
11	Walda Mehrat			Warada Nagash from Rossini's lists B and F.
12	Warada Sahay			
13	Ausayo	Ausyo; Asanya		Awseya from Rossni's lists B and C.
14	Ilalyos			Elalyon from Rossini's list B.
15	Toma Seyon	Tomasyon		
16	Ba'os			Basyo from Rossini's lists B and D.
17	Awestet			Awtet from Rossini's lists B and D.
18	Zaware Nebrat			
19	Safay	Safaya		
20	Ramhay			
21	Safalya			
22	Engeleb	Negeleb		Aglebul or Aglebu from Rossini's lists B and C.
23	Gawras			Bawaris from Rossini's lists B and C.
24	Bawel	Bawl		Bawawel from Rossini's lists B and D.
25	Benden	Henden		Possibly Awsena from Rossini's lists C and D.
26	Mahasi	Mahase		
27	Laka			Nalke from Rossini's list B.
28	Bazen	Gazen		In the eighth year of his reign, Christ was born.
CE era
29	Germa Sor			His royal name was Kaleb according to this list.; Possibly the same person as Sarada from Rossini's lists A and D.
30	Sarguay	Sharguay		
31	Zaray			
32	Seyon Geza	Syon Geza		Seyon Hegez from Rossini's list A.
33	Sabe Asgad	Sabea Asgad		
34	Abendir	Ahendir		Possibly Mawa'el Genh from Rossini's lists A and D.
35	Tazer			His royal name was Sayfa Arad according to this list. According to some chronicles, a king named "Seifa Arad" was the father of Abreha and Atsbeha.
Christian era
36	Abreha and Asbeha (joint rule)		65 years	
37	Abreha and Asbeha (joint rule)		65 years	
38	Asbeha (sole rule)		15 years	
39	Asfeha	Asfeh		
40	Arfasked			Arfed from Rossini's lists A, B and D.
41	Amse			
42	Aladeb			Saladoba from Rossini's lists A, B and D.
43	Almeda			
44	Tazena			
45	Kaleb		40 years	
46	Gabra Masqal		40 years	
47	Yeshaq			His royal name was Quastantinos according to this list. That name appears on Rossini's lists A, B, C, D, E and G.
48	Fere Sanay	Fere Shanaya		
49	Wasan Sagad			
50	Degna Mikael			
51	Deraz			
52	Degzan			Zergaz from Rossini's lists A, B, D and F.
53	Germa Sor			
54	Akala Wedem			
55	Bahr Ekla	Bahra Ekala		May be the same person as Badagaz from Rossini's lists A and D.
56	Gum			
57	Asagum	Ashagum		
58	Latem			
59	Talatem			
60	Adhas	Adgos; Adhsha		Oda Gos from Rossini's list B and Bada Gos from list F.
61	Ayzur		Half a day	
62	Awdamdem			Combination of Dedem and Wededem from Rossini's list B.
63	Wedem Masfare	Awdemasfare		
64	Armah			
65	Degzan	Degjan		
66	Anbasa Wedem			
67	Del Na'ad		40 years.	

=== Rossini List F ===
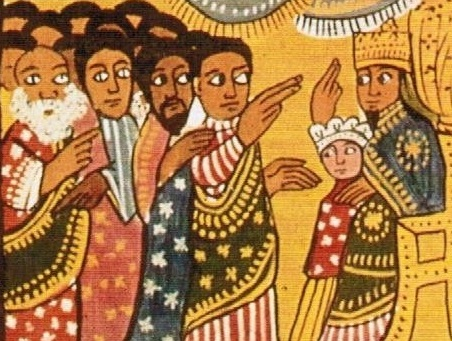
Angabo shown with Makeda, who is his daughter in this version of the legend.

Carlo Conti Rossini's list F is based on two manuscripts. Each manuscript has some variation of names and order, and will be referred to as "FA" and "FB" on this list, as quoted by Frederick Edwards (FA) and Joseph Tubiana (FB) respectively. Version FA includes 34 names from Angabo to Dil Na'od, while FB includes 31 names from Menelik I to Dil Na'od. At least one of these manuscripts was dated to the 16th century.

#	Name	Alternate names	Reign length	Notes
BCE era
1	Agabos			Only on version FA.; "Agabos of Atray, of Sarawe" (a province of Tigray region).; This list states he was the father of the "Queen of the South".
2	Makeda		50 years	Only on version FA.; "Queen of the South".
3	Ebna El-Hakim	Menelik	?	
4	Abrakid	Tomay	7 years	Royal name of Tomay from Rossini's list B.
5	Atarem	Ataram; Ytamor; Ytamer	10 years	Unique to this list.
6	Abralyus	Abralyu	9 years	
7	Warada Sahay		32 years	Name means "the Sun has descended" according to Rossini.
8	Warada Nagas	Warada Nagash	7 years	
9	Bazen			
CE era
10	Palez	Pulza; Pelza	12 years	Version FA places these five kings before Bazen, but version FB places them after Bazen. They have been placed after Bazen in this table because Tazer follows him on other lists. The first four of these names are unique to this list. Though Rossini theorised the name Kalem was meant to be Kaleb, who is missing from one version of list F.
11	Fazel			Version FA places these five kings before Bazen, but version FB places them after Bazen. They have been placed after Bazen in this table because Tazer follows him on other lists. The first four of these names are unique to this list. Though Rossini theorised the name Kalem was meant to be Kaleb, who is missing from one version of list F.
12	Kalem			Version FA places these five kings before Bazen, but version FB places them after Bazen. They have been placed after Bazen in this table because Tazer follows him on other lists. The first four of these names are unique to this list. Though Rossini theorised the name Kalem was meant to be Kaleb, who is missing from one version of list F.
13	Talem			Version FA places these five kings before Bazen, but version FB places them after Bazen. They have been placed after Bazen in this table because Tazer follows him on other lists. The first four of these names are unique to this list. Though Rossini theorised the name Kalem was meant to be Kaleb, who is missing from one version of list F.
14	Tazer			Version FA places these five kings before Bazen, but version FB places them after Bazen. They have been placed after Bazen in this table because Tazer follows him on other lists. The first four of these names are unique to this list. Though Rossini theorised the name Kalem was meant to be Kaleb, who is missing from one version of list F.
Christian era
15	Abreha and Asbeha (joint rule)		13 years	No sole rule is mentioned for either of these kings.
16	Abreha and Asbeha (joint rule)		13 years	No sole rule is mentioned for either of these kings.
17	Dalez			Unique to this list. May be the same person as Asfeha on lists A, B, C, D and F.
18	Sahel Iyekale	Sahel Iyekala		Unique to this lists. May be the same person as Sahel on Rossini's list C.
19	Kaleb		30 years	Only on version FA.
20	Gabra Masqal		37 years	
21	Ma'eda Kala			Moved further down, between Ayzur and Mededem on version FB.; Ma'eday from Rossini's lists A and D.
22	Zergaz			Moved further down, between Talatam and Badagos on version FB.
23	Bahra Iyekal			Bahr Ikla from Rossini's lists B and E. May be the same person as Badagaz from Rossini's lists A and D.
24	Guem			
25	Asgomgum			
26	Letem			
27	Talatam	Telatem		
28	Bada Gos	Bada Guas		Oda Gos from Rossini's list B.
29	Ayzur		Half a day	
30	Medemam			Dedem from Rossini's list B.
31	Wedem			Either Wededem or Wedem Asfare from Rossini's list B.
32	Leb Dahari and Engeda Qare (joint rule)	Engede Qare	15 years	Engeda Qare is unique to this list, while Leb Dahari only appears elsewhere on list G.
33	Leb Dahari and Engeda Qare (joint rule)	Engede Qare	15 years	Engeda Qare is unique to this list, while Leb Dahari only appears elsewhere on list G.
34	Del Na'ad			

=== Rossini List G ===
Carlo Conti Rossini's list G is based on a single manuscript held in the Bibliotheque Nationale in Paris (Manuscript 149). This list has some names that do not appear elsewhere, and also some names are out of order compared to other lists.

#	Name	Alternate names	Notes
BCE era
1	Menelik		
2	Barakid		Royal name of Tomay from Rossini's lists B and F.
3	Abramyos		Abralyus from Rossini's lists B and F.
4	Tazena		
5	Pazena		
6	Qualiza		
7	Warada Sahay		Name means "the Sun has descended" according to Rossini.
8	Dangas		
9	Tazen		
10	Pazen		
11	Dalez		Otherwise only appears on list F.
12	Guam		
13	Asguamguam		
14	Letem		
15	Talatem		
16	Abreha		
17	Gefa		
18	Badgeza		
19	Zergaz		
20	Madmen	Madem	
21	Wedem		
22	Germa Asfare	Germa Asfere	
23	Leb Dahare		These two kings otherwise only appear on list F.
24	Enza Ykre		These two kings otherwise only appear on list F.
25	Nagesre		
26	Hesba Arad	Hezb Arad	
27	Bahr Arad		
28	Ma'ekala Wedem		
29	Bahra Wedem		
30	Bazen		
CE era
31	Senfa Asgad		
32	Bahr Asgad		
33	Germa Asfare		Second appearance of this name on this list.
34	Serad		Sarada from Rossini's list A.
35	Kuelu Syon		
36	Sargo Syon		Sarguay from Rossini's lists A, B, D and E.
37	Zara Syon		Zaray from Rossini's lists A, B, C, D and E.
38	Bagam		
39	Zan Asged		
40	Syon Heg		
41	Mela		Rossini's lists A and D have both names belong to one king, Mawa'el Genh.
42	Genha		Rossini's lists A and D have both names belong to one king, Mawa'el Genh.
43	Saf Arad		According to some chronicles, he was the father of Abreha and Atsbeha.
44	Agedar		
Christian era
45	Abreha and Atsbeha (joint rule)		They "built the Cathedral of Aksum on the water".
46	Abreha and Atsbeha (joint rule)		They "built the Cathedral of Aksum on the water".
47	Asfa Sahel		Possibly a combination of Asfeha from Rossini's lists A, B, C, D and E and Sahel from Rossini's list C.
48	Asged		
49	Mes'r		Amsi from Rossini's lists A, B, D and E.
50	Aradu		
51	Ela Adoba		
52	Alamed		
53	Tazena		Second appearance of this name on this list.
54	Kaleb		
55	Gabra Masqal		
56	Quastantinos		
57	Bezegar		
58	Asfah Sahel		Second appearance of this name on this list.
59	Armah		
60	Zan Sagad		
61	Fere Sanay		
62	Edra'az		
63	Ayzar		
64	Kuelo Dem		
65	Germa Asfare		Third appearance of this name on this list.
66	Zare Agez	Ra'agez	Zergaz from Rossini's lists A, B, D and F.
67	Degna Mikael		
68	Badgeza		Name listed twice consecutively on this list.
69	Badgeza		Name listed twice consecutively on this list.
70	Armah		Second appearance of this name on this list.
71	Hezb Nan		
72	Degnazan		
73	Anbasa Wedem		
74	Del Na'ad		

=== Rossini List H ===
Carlo Conti Rossini's list H is noticeably different from other list variations. Despite containing some familiar names, many names are unique to this list. It is based on three manuscripts. This list contains 25 names from Menelik I to Luzay.

An alternate version with 27 names was found in one copy of the Kebra Nagast which adds names and reign lengths of Ethiopian emperors from the 17th and 18th centuries. This manuscript was in the collection of Antoine Thomson d'Abbadie (Manuscript 97).

#	Name	Alternate names	Reign length	Notes
1	Ebne Hakim	Menelik	?	
2	Tomay	Tomas; Tomada	10 years	
3	Azbay	Hezbay	27 years	Zagdur from Rossini's lists B, D and E.
4	Aksumay		?	
5	Takalay	Taklay	5 years	
6	Henquqay		15 years	
7	Absalisu	Abli	24 years and 8 months	
8	Ori		2 years and 9 months	
9	Elsa Syon		10 years and 1 month	Elalyon or Ilalyos from Rossini's lists B and D.
10	Toma Syon		11 years	
11	Agazinar	Agazi Nar	3 years and 12 months [sic]	Basyo or Gasyo from Rossini's lists B, C, D and E.
12	Zawari Nebrat		?	
13	Sayfay		11 years	
14	Ramhay		15 years	
15	Ahow		17 years	Ahow means "brothers", which suggests that listing this as a monarch may be an error and was originally meant to refer to the two previous names as brothers.
16	Hohay	Hohaw	16 years	
17	Nagsay		18 years	
18	Lulay	Susay	19 years	
19	Masalni	Baslin	20 years	
20	Sanay		20 years	
21	Dawit		22 years	
22	Amoy		23 years	
23	Duniday		24 years	
24	Yoday	Yodad	25 years	
25	Luzay	Luzoy	?	

=== Comparison of the regnal lists ===
==== Succession order on Rossini's lists ====
The following table compares the order of names on the eight list versions recorded by Carlo Conti Rossini. The table shows the number of manuscripts each list was compiled from. List G has a number of duplicate names and names that are out of order from the other lists (e.g. Christian era names being placed in the pre-Christian era and vice versa). These out of place names and positions are written in italics.

Legendary period
BCE period
CE (Pre-Christian) period
Christian period

Comparative table of Carlo Conti Rossini's lists A–H
Name	A (22)	B (33)	C (16)	D (6)	E (1)	F (2)	G (1)	H (3)
Arwe			1		1			
Angabo			2	1	2	1		
[Za] Gedur I			3					
Sebado			4					
Qawasya I			5					
Makeda			6		3	2		
Menelik (C, D, G) / Ibn Al-Hakim (B, F, H) / David I		1	7	2	4	3	1	1
Tomai (B, H) / Ab-Rakid (E, F, G)		2			5	4	2	2
[Za] Gedur II (B, D, E) / Azbay (H)		3		3	6			3
Aksumay		4			7			4
Handadyo I (C) / Handar (E)			8		9			
Awda Amat (C) / Awida I			9					
Awseyo I (B, C, E) / Subabasyu (D)		5	10	4	8			
Tahawasya (B, D) / Sawe (C) / Taosya (E) / Qawasya II		6	11	5	10			
Atarem						5		
Abralyus (B, F) / Abramyos (G)		7				6	3	
Walda Mehrat					11			
Tazena (duplicate)							4	
Pazena (duplicate)							5	
Qualiza							6	
Warada Sahay		8			12	7	7	
Dangas							8	
Tazen (duplicate)							9	
Pazen (duplicate)							10	
Handadyo II		9		6				
Warada Nagash (B, F) / Wareza (D)		10		7		8		
Awseya (B) / Awseyo II (D, E)		11		8	13			
Elalyon (B) / Illalyos (E)		12			14			
Masyo				9				
Toma Seyon (B, E) / Sawa (D)		13		10	15			
Basyo (B, D) / Gasyo (C) / Ba'os (E)		14	12	11	16			
Awtet I (B, D) / Mawat (C) / Awestet (E)		15	13	12	17			
Zaware Nebrat		16			18			12
Sayfay		17			19			13
Ramhay		18			20			14
Ahow ("brothers")								15
Bahas			14	13				
Qawida (C) / Sawada (D)			15	14				
Qanaz			16					
Hande (B) / Haduna (C) / Hadena (D) / Hohey (H)		19	17	15				16
Wazha			18					
Hadir			19					
Kalas			20	16				
Satyo (C) / Gotya (D)			21	17				
Safelya (B, D, E) / Filya (C)		20	22	18	21			
Nagsay								17
Aglebul (B, D) / Aglebu (C) / Engeleb (E) / Lulay (H)		21	23	19	22			18
Bawawel (B, D) / Bawel (E)		22		20	24			
Awsena			24	22				
Bawaris (B, D) / Birwas (C) / Gawras (E)		23	25	21	23			
Benden					25			
Mahase (B, D, E) / Mahsi (C) / Masalni (H)		24	26	23	26			19
Sanay								20
Dawit II								21
Amoy								22
Duniday								23
Yoday								24
Nalke (B, D) / Laka (E) / Luzay (H)		25		24	27			25
Nagesre							25	
Hesba Arad							26	
Bahr Arad							27	
Ma'ekala Wedem							28	
Bahra Wedem							29	
Bazen	1	26	27	25	28	9	30	
Senfa Asgad (A, D, G) / Senfa Ared (B)	2	27		26			31	
Bahr Asgad	3	28		27			32	
Germa Sor		29			29			
Germa Asfare I (A, B, G) / Germa Safer (D)	4	30		28			33	
Sarada (A) / Serado (D) / Serad (G)	5			29			34	
Kuelu Lasyon	6			30			35	
Sarguay (A, B, D, E) / Sargo Syon (G)	7	31		31	30		36	
Zaray (A, B, D, E) / Zara Syon (G)	8	32		32	31		37	
Bagamay (A) / Bagam (G)	9						38	
Djan Asgad (A, G)	10						39	
Saba Asgad (B, E) / Sen Asgad (D)		33		33	33			
Seyon Hegez (A, D, G) / Seyon Geza (B, E)	11	34		34	32		40	
Mawa'al Genh (A) / Ma'al Ganah (D) / Ahendir (E)	12			35	34		41 & 42	
Sartu			28					
La'as			29					
Masenh			30					
Satwa			31					
Adgala			32					
Agba			33					
Malis			34					
Haqle			35					
Demahe			36					
Awtet II			37					
Awida II			38					
Zegen and Rema (co-rulers)			39 & 40					
Gafale			41					
Besi Sarq			42					
Azguagua			43					
Herka			44					
Saweza			45					
Wakana			46					
Hadaws			47					
Sagal			48					
Asfeha I			49					
Segab			50					
Samara			51					
Ayba			52					
Eskendi			53					
Saham I			54					
San			55					
Ayga			56					
Palez						10		
Fazel						11		
Kalem						12		
Talem						13		
Saifa Arad (A, B, D, E, G) / Amida I (C) / Tazer (E, F)	13	36	57	36	35	14	43	
Agdur	14	35		37			44	
Ahyawa			58					
Abreha I and Atsbeha I (co-rulers)	15 & 16	37 & 38	59 & 60	38 & 39	36 & 37	15 & 16	45 & 46	
Abreha I (Sole rule)		38						
Atsbeha II (Sole rule)			60		38			
Asfeha II (A, B, C, D, E) / Asfa Sahel (G)	17	39	61	40	39		47	
Arfed (A, C) / Arfasked (E) / Asged (G)	18 & 19	40		41	40		48	
Amsi (A, C, D) / Mes'r (G)	18 & 19	41		42	41		49	
Arad (A, D) / Aradu (G)	20			43			50	
Saladoba (A, B) / Aladeb (E) / Ela Adoba (G)	21	42			42		51	
Dalez						17	11	
Sahel I (C) / Sahel Iyekale (F)			62			18		
Adhana I			63					
Rete'e			64					
Asfeha III			65					
Atsbeha II			66					
Amida II			67					
Abreha II			68				16	
Sahel II			69					
Gabaz I (C) / Gefa (G)			70				17	
Sahel III			71					
Asbah			72					
Abreha III and Adhana II (co-rulers)			73 & 74					
Saham II			75					
Amida III			76					
Sahel IV			77					
Sebah			78					
Saham III			79					
Gabaz II			80					
Agabe and Levi (co-rulers)			81 & 82					
[Al] Amida IV	22	43	83	44	43		52	
Yaqob I and David II (co-rulers)			84 & 85					
Armah I			86					
Tazena (A, B, D, E, G) / Zitana (C)	23	44	87	45	44		53	
Yaqob II			88					
Kaleb (A, B, D, E, F) / Constantinos I (C)	24	45	89	46	45	19	54	
[Beta] Esrael			90					
Gabra Masqal	25	46	91	47	46	20	55	
Constantinos II (A, B, D, E, G) / Yeshaq (E)	26	47		48	47		56	
Bazgar	27			49			57	
Asfeha IV (A, D) / Asfah Sahel (G)	28			50			58	
Armah II	29			51			59	
Jan Asfeh	30			52				
Jan Asgad (A, D, G) / Wasan Asgad (C, E)	31	48		53	49		60	
Fere Sanay	32	49		54	48		61	
Aderaz	33	50		55			62	
Ayzur	34	61		56	61	29	63	
Dil Na'od	35	69		67	67	34	74	
Maday (A, D) / Ma'eda Kala (F)	36			57		21		
Esato / Gudit	37							
Anbasa Wedem I	38							
Kuala Wedem (A, D, G) / Ekla Udem (B) / Akala Wedem (E)	39	51		58	54		64	
Germa Asfare II (A, B, D, G) / Germa Sor (E)	40	52		59	53		65	
Zergaz (A, B, D, F, G) / Deraz (E)	41	53		60	51	22	66	
Degzan					52			
Degna Mikael	42	54		61	50		67	
Badagaz	43			62			68 & 69	
Bahr Ekla (B, E) / Bahra Iyekal (F)		55			55	23		
Gum		56			56	24	12	
Asguamguam		57			57	25	13	
Letem		58			58	26	14	
Talatem		59			59	27	15	
Oda Gosh (B) / Adhas (E) / Bada Gos (F)		60			60	28		
Badgeza (duplicate)							18	
Zergaz (duplicate)							19	
Dedem		62			62			
Wededem (B) / Medemam (F) / Madmen (G)		63			62	30	20	
Wedem Asfare (B, E) / Wedem (F, G)		64			63	31	21	
Germa Asfare (duplicate)							22	
Leb Dahari and Engeda Qare (co-rulers)						32 & 33	23 & 24	
Armah III	44	65		63	64		70	
Hezba Nan	45			64			71	
Degna Djan	46	66		65	65		72	
Geda Djan		67						
Anbasa Wedem II	47	68		66	66		73	
Terdae Gabaz	48							

==== Time span on lists with reign lengths ====
List	Year of publication	BCE era (Menelik I to Bazen)	Pagan CE era	Christian CE era (up to Gabra Masqal)	Total time span
Mariano Vittori	1552	285 years and ½ a day	368 years, 2 months and 2 days	311 years, 11 months and 7 days	965 years, 1 month and 9½ days (Menelik I to Gabra Masqal)
Pedro Páez List 2	1620	206 years, 1 month and ½ a day	403 years, 9 months and 2 days	280 years and 8 days	889 years, 10 months and 10½ days (Menelik I to Gabra Masqal)
James Bruce	1790	228 years	–	–	228 years (Menelik I to Bazen)
Henry Salt List 1	1814	136 years, 2 months and ½ a day	440 years and 2 days (or 304 years, 4 months and 2 days (Note: Adjusted total when following Salt's suggestion that Abreha and Atsbeha's reign be moved after Semera's reign.))	–	576 years, 2 months and 2½ days (Menelik I to Abreha and Atsbeha)
Edmond Combes and Maurice Tamisier List 1	1838	226 years	443 years, 6 months and 2 days (or 307 years, 10 months and 2 days (Note: Adjusted total when following Salt's suggestion that Abreha and Atsbeha's reign be moved after Semera's reign.))	–	669 years, 6 months and 2 days (Menelik I to Abreha and Atsbeha)
Edmond Combes and Maurice Tamisier List 2	1838	150 years and 4 months	443 years, 6 months and 2 days (or 307 years, 10 months and 2 days)	–	593 years, 10 months and 2 days (Menelik I to Abreha and Atsbeha)
August Dillmann List A	1853	213 years, 4 months and ½ a day	412 years, 9 months and 1 day	265 years, 5 months and 8 days	891 years, 6 months and 9½ days (Menelik I to Gabra Masqal)
British Museum manuscript (Oriental No. 821, fol. 28b)	1928	228 years, 1 month and ½ a day	435 years and 2 days	–	663 years, 1 month and 2½ days (Menelik I to Abreha and Atsbeha)

The 1922 regnal list attempted to combine the different lists after Abreha and Atsbeha into one line succession dating from 306 to 920 E.C., and did this by placing most of the kings in Dillmann's List A/Rossini's List C directly after Abreha and Atsbeha and then continuing the line with the kings from List B. This allowed a sufficient number of kings to reign between Abreha and Atsbeha in the early 4th century and Alla Amidas in the late 5th century, and also continued the line of kings into the early 10th century.

=== Alternate pre-Menelik regnal lists ===
==== Beginning with Adam ====
This regnal list chronicles kings who ruled before Menelik I, but relies on Biblical chronology, particularly from the Book of Genesis. This list essentially serves as a document of the lineage of Menelik through his father Solomon.

The following list was included in E. A. Wallis Budge's book A History of Ethiopia (Volume I) and was quoted from two manuscripts; One held in the British Museum and another held in the Bibliothèque nationale de France, which was published in René Basset's 1882 book Études sur l'histoire d'Éthiopie. The names of these kings also appear in the 14th-century text Kebra Nagast. Budge believed this list had "no historical value" and was only intended to fill the gap from Adam to Solomon.

The last king, 'Ebna Hakim, does not appear in the Bible and is meant to be Menelik I, the son of Solomon and the Queen of Sheba. The name Ebna Hakim translates to "Son of the Wise Man" (i.e. Solomon) in Arabic.

Order	Ethiopian name	Biblical figure
1	'Adam	Adam
2	Set	Seth
3	Henos	Enos
4	Kaynan	Kenan
5	Malalel	Mahalalel
6	Yared	Jared
7	Henok	Enoch
8	Matusala	Methuselah
9	Lameh	Lamech
10	Noh	Noah
11	Shem	Shem
12	Alfasked	Arphaxad
13	Kaynan	Cainan
14	Sala	Selah
15	'Ebor	Eber
16	Falek	Peleg
17	Ragwe	Reu
18	Seruh	Serug
19	Nakor	Nahor
20	Tara	Terah
21	Abreham	Abram
22	Yeshak	Isaac
23	Ya'kob	Jacob
24	Yehuda	Judah
25	Fares	Pharez
26	'Esrom	Hezron
27	'Eram	Aram
28	'Aminadab	Amminadab
29	Na'ason	Nahshon
30	Salmon	Salmon
31	Bo'ez	Boaz
32	Iyobed	Obed
33	'Eshey	Jesse
34	Dawit	David
35	Saloman	Solomon
36	'Ebna Hakim	–

The Kebra Nagast lists an additional king named 'Orni between Hezron and Aram, who was the son of Hezron and father of Aram. Budge believed this king to be Oren, son of Jerahmeel.

==== Beginning with Ham ====
Another Ethiopian tradition claims that the Ethiopian monarchy was descended from Ham, son of the Biblical prophet Noah. While Ham is not included in the Biblical regnal list mentioned above, a claimed genealogy from Ham to the founders of Axum does exist. According to this tradition, Axum was founded within a century after the Great Flood. This genealogy chronicles kings descending from Ham who represent Ethiopia and Axum. E. A. Wallis Budge called this dynasty the "Dynasty of Kush" and referred to the Angabo dynasty as the "Native African dynasty".

Enno Littmann recorded a tradition from an Ethiopian priest named Gabra Wahad, who stated the following:

Ham begot Kush, Kush begot Aethiopis, after whom the country is called Aethiopia to this day. Aethiopis was buried in Aksum, and his grave is known there to this day. It was said that a fire used to burn in it, and that if any donkey's excrement, or any bit of stuff fell into it, it was consumed. Aethiopis begot 'Aksumawi, 'Aksumawi begot Malayka 'Aksum, and begot also Sum, Nafas, Bagi'o, Kuduki, 'Akhoro, Fasheba. These six sons of 'Aksumawi became the fathers of Aksum. When they wished to divide their land, there came a man called May Bih, and as people say divided their land as an agent. Each of the six gave him two acres of land and he settled down with them.

Order	Name	Relation to predecessor	Notes
1	Ham	–	–
2	Kush	Son of Ham	–
3	Aethiopis	Son of Kush	The king whose name inspired the name "Ethiopia".
4	'Aksumawi	Son of Aethiopis	Traditional founder of Axum.
5	Malayka Aksum	Son of 'Aksumawi	–
–	Sum	Son of 'Aksumawi	The six sons of 'Aksumawi were the "fathers" of Aksum but were not kings of Ethiopia. Budge believed that they may have "[represented] the dynasty of the serpent which was destroyed by Angabo".
–	Nafaz	Son of 'Aksumawi	The six sons of 'Aksumawi were the "fathers" of Aksum but were not kings of Ethiopia. Budge believed that they may have "[represented] the dynasty of the serpent which was destroyed by Angabo".
–	Bagi'o	Son of 'Aksumawi	The six sons of 'Aksumawi were the "fathers" of Aksum but were not kings of Ethiopia. Budge believed that they may have "[represented] the dynasty of the serpent which was destroyed by Angabo".
–	Kuduki	Son of 'Aksumawi	The six sons of 'Aksumawi were the "fathers" of Aksum but were not kings of Ethiopia. Budge believed that they may have "[represented] the dynasty of the serpent which was destroyed by Angabo".
–	Akhoro	Son of 'Aksumawi	The six sons of 'Aksumawi were the "fathers" of Aksum but were not kings of Ethiopia. Budge believed that they may have "[represented] the dynasty of the serpent which was destroyed by Angabo".
–	Farheba	Son of 'Aksumawi	The six sons of 'Aksumawi were the "fathers" of Aksum but were not kings of Ethiopia. Budge believed that they may have "[represented] the dynasty of the serpent which was destroyed by Angabo".

== Zagwe dynasty lists ==
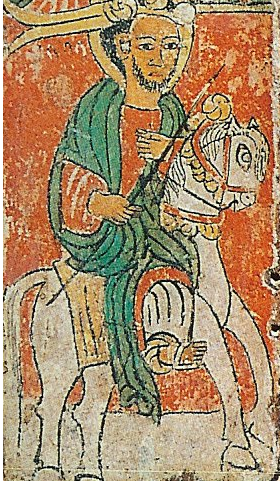
Lalibala, who appears on all Zagwe lists.

Ethiopian and Eritrean traditions are in agreement that the Zagwe dynasty ruled at some point after the fall of Axum in the 10th century and directly preceded the Solomonic dynasty (1270–1974), but differ regarding when this dynasty first came to power, how long it remained in power and even the number of kings who ruled.

Ethiopian historian Sergew Hable Selassie noted there are three main lists of Zagwe kings, known as the short, long and longer lists. He felt that the longer list was probably the most accurate.

=== Short List ===
Recorded in Carlo Conti Rossini's work Storia d'Etiopia (p. 305). Pedro Páez recorded a version with reign lengths and noted this list was likely incomplete. Manuel de Almeida also quoted a list that claimed this dynasty only had 5 kings who ruled for 143 years. A manuscript held in Paris (no. 64) claimed the Zagwe dynasty had 5 kings whose rule began in either 1145 or 1147 and ended in either 1268 or 1270.

#	Name	Reign Lengths	Notes
1	Mera	15 years	Also known as Mara Takla Haymanot.
2	Yimreha	40 years	Also known as Yemrehana Krestos.
3	Lalibela	40 years	–
4	Na'akueto La'ab	40 years	–
5	Harbe	8 years	–
Total		143 years	

=== Long list ===
==== Variation 1 ====
Recorded in Carlo Conti Rossini's work Storia d'Etiopia, Eduard Rüppell's Reise in Abyssinien and René Basset's Études sur l'histoire d'Éthiopie. Also recorded in the Paris Chronicle and a manuscript held in the British Museum (Or. 821, fol. 28b). The 1922 regnal list of Ethiopia uses a similar list of kings for the Zagwe dynasty, but with some differences in reign length, giving the dynasty a total of 333 years of rule.

James Bruce used this version of this list in his book Travels to Discover the Source of the Nile, though considered Tatadim, Jan Seyum, Germa Seyum, Harbai and Mairari to be descendants of Gudit who ruled at Lasta, while the other six kings were theorised to be Christian according to Bruce.

#	Name	Reign Length	Notes
1	Mara Takla Haymanot	3 years	The 1922 regnal list records 13 years of rule. Both Rüppell's list and the 1922 regnal list give the name "Zagwe" as the name of this king.
2	Tetewudem	40 years	–
3	Jan Seyum	40 years	–
4	Germa Seyum	40 years	–
5	Yemrehana Krestos	40 years	–
6	Kedus Harbe	40 years	Named "Kedus Arbe (Samt)" on the 1922 regnal list.
7	Lalibela	40 years	–
8	Na'akueto La'ab	48 years	The 1922 regnal list records 40 years of rule.
9	Yetbarak	40 years	The 1922 regnal list records 17 years of rule.
10	Mairari	15 years	Rüppell noted that a chronicle from Kiratza stated this king reigned for 18 years.
11	Harbai	8 years	Rüppell noted that a chronicle from Kiratza stated this king reigned for 23 years.
Total		354 years	

==== Variation 2 ====
Recorded in Eduard Rüppell's Reise in Abyssinien and Carlo Conti Rossini's "La caduta della dinastia Zague" (p. 295). Rüppell's list originated from the Chronicle of Berhan Sagad and stated these kings reigned for a total of 333 years.

#	Monarch	Name variation		Notes
–	Zagwe	Rüppell (1)	Sague	The name of this dynasty is mistakenly listed by Rüppell as the founding monarch of this line. He believed that "Sague" was a queen who founded this dynasty after overthrowing the Axumite line. This story however relates to Gudit and it is unconfirmed if she had any link to the Zagwe kings, though some traditions claims she did.
1	Mara Takla Haymanot	Rüppell (2)	Panetau	
1	Mara Takla Haymanot	Rossini (1)	Pentew	
2	Tatadim	Rüppell (3)	Panetadim	
2	Tatadim	Rossini (2)	Pentedim	
3	Jan Seyum	Rüppell (4)	Schan Sejum	
3	Jan Seyum	Rossini (3)	Jan Seyoum	
4	Germa Seyum	Rüppell (5)	Schan Görema	
4	Germa Seyum	Rossini (4)	Jan Grima	
5	Kedus Harbe	Rüppell (6)	Schan Arbe	
5	Kedus Harbe	Rossini (5)	Harbé	
6	Lalibela	Rüppell (7)	Lalibela	
6	Lalibela	Rossini (6)	Lalibela	
7	Na'akueto La'ab	Rüppell (8)	Naqueto Labu	
7	Na'akueto La'ab	Rossini (7)	Ne'akuto Le'ab	
8	Yemrehana Krestos	Rüppell (9)	Jemorahn Kristos	
8	Yemrehana Krestos	Rossini (8)	Yimrehane Kristos	
9	Yetbarak	Rüppell (10)	Jetbarak Oegsiaböhör	
9	Yetbarak	Rossini (9)	Yitbarek	

==== Variation 3 ====
Recorded by Carlo Conti Rossini from a text from Dabra Libanos.

#	Name	Reign Length	Notes
1	Takla Haymanot	40 years	–
2	Jan Seyum	40 years	–
3	Germa Seyum	40 years	–
4	Gempawedamo	40 years	Third son of Mara Takla Haymanot. Possibly Tatadim.
5	Yemreha	40 years	–
6	Gabra Maryam	40 years	Also known as Kedus Harbe.
7	Lalibala	40 years	–
8	Na'akueto La'ab	40 years	–
9	Yetbarak	9 years	–
Total		329 years	

=== Longer list ===
#	Name	Reign Length	Dates	Notes
1	Mara Takla Haymanot	13 years	920–933	Son-in-law of Dil Na'od.
2	Sibuhay (Dil Ne'ad II)	10 years	933–943	Not to be confused with Dil Na'od.
3	Meyrary	15 years	943–958	–
4	Harbey (Hareyene Egzi)	8 years	958–966	–
5	Mengisine Yitbarek	7 years	966–973	–
6	Yi'kebke Egzi	10 years	973–983	–
7	Zena Petros	6 years	983–989	Killed in battle against the Kingdom of Damot.
8	Bahr Saf	14 years	989–1003	–
9	Tetewudem (Ser Assegid)	10 years	1003–1013	Descendant of Mara Takla Haymanot.
10	Akotet (Jan Seyoum)	20 years	1013–1033	Brother of Tatadim.
11	Be'mnet (Girma Seyoum)	20 years	1033–1053	Brother of Jan Seyum.
12	Yimrehane Kristos	40 years	1053–1093	Son of Germa Seyum. Capital was Adefa during his reign.
13	Gebre Mariam	40 years	1093–1133	Also known as Kedus Harbe. Son of Jan Seyum. Previously governor of Lasta. Abdicated.
14	Lalibela	40 years	1133–1173	Son of Jan Seyum. Previously governor of Lasta. Abdicated. Alternate dates: 1160–1211, 1180–1220 or 1205–1255
15	Ne'akuto Le'ab	40 years	1173–1213	Son of Kedus Harbe. Abdicated. Alternate dates: c. 1145–1215, 1211–1251/1259 or 1220–1268
16	Yitbarek	40 years	1213–1253	Son of Lalibela. "Pretender" to the throne from 1173 to 1213. Died in battle at Daga Qirqos.
Total		333 years		

== Descendants of the Axumite line during the Zagwe period ==
Some regnal lists include names of monarchs who were descended from Dil Na'od and preceded the restoration of the line under Yekuno Amlak. According to Henry Salt, these kings were based in Shewa after the family fled there following the destruction of Axum by Gudit.

The following lists are included in this table:

- A list published in Henry Salt's A Voyage to Abyssinia (1814). Salt dated their period of rule to 925–1255.
- A list published by René Basset in 1882. This list stated that each king was the son of the previous king, with these kings representing eight generations directly from Dil Na'od to Yekuno Amlak.
- A list published by E. A. Wallis Budge in 1928 in his book A History of Ethiopia: Nubia and Abyssinia (volume 1).

No.	Common name	List and Position	Name on List	Notes
1	Mahbara Wedem	Salt (1)	Maimersa Woodim	
1	Mahbara Wedem	Basset (1)	Mâkhbara-Ouēdēm	
1	Mahbara Wedem	Budge (1)	Māhbara Wedem	
2	Agba Seyon	Salt (2)	Agva Sion	
2	Agba Seyon	Basset (2)	Agbēa-Ṣyon	
2	Agba Seyon	Budge (2)	Agbēa Seyōn	
3	Senfa Arad	Salt (3)	Sin Fārat	
3	Senfa Arad	Basset (3)	Ṣēnfa-Ar'ēd	Numbered the third king of this name by Basset.
3	Senfa Arad	Budge (3)	Ṣenfa 'Ar'ad	
4	Nagash Zare	Salt (4)	Negush Záree	
4	Nagash Zare	Basset (4)	Nagâch-Zâré	
4	Nagash Zare	Budge (4)	Nagāsha Zārē	
5	Asfeh	Salt (5)	Atzfé	
5	Asfeh	Basset (5)	Asfēḥ	Numbered the second king of this name by Basset.
5	Asfeh	Budge (5)	'Asfeḥ	
6	Yakob	Salt (6)	Yakoob	
6	Yakob	Basset (6)	Yâ'qob	
6	Yakob	Budge (6)	Yā'akōb	
7	Bahr Asgad	Salt (7)	Birasgud	
7	Bahr Asgad	Basset (7)	Bâhr-Asgēd	
7	Bahr Asgad	Budge (7)	Bāhr 'Asgād	
–	Asgad	Salt (8)	Asgúd	Possibly a duplicate of the previous king.
8	Edem Asgad	Salt (9)	Woodem Asgúd	
8	Edem Asgad	Basset (8)	Ēdēm-Asgēd	
8	Edem Asgad	Budge (8)	'Edēm 'Asgād	

== Alternate variations of the Solomonic line ==
Beginning with the reign of Yekuno Amlak, the line of rulers becomes more consistently noted and dated across various regnal lists. However, some emperors have been excluded from certain lists:

- The first regnal list quoted by Pedro Páez omitted two of the sons of Yagbe'u Seyon.
- The second regnal list quoted by Pedro Páez omitted Andreyas, who reigned for 6 months in 1429 and 1430. The same regnal list did not name directly the ephemeral sons of Yagbe'u Seyon, but simply stated that two of his sons ruled for three years followed by three grandsons who reigned for two years.
- The 1922 regnal list of Ethiopia omitted Susenyos II, perhaps due to doubts over his legitimacy.

A manuscript from the Debre Damo church provided a slightly altered line of succession from Yekuno Amlak to Lebna Dengel:

Debre Damo List	Conventional List (with common numbering and reign lengths)
Yekuno-Amlak (40 years)	Yekuno Amlak (1) (15 years)
Wedema-Ar'ed (15 years)	Wedem Arad (8) (15 years)
Qedema-Asgad, Hezba-Asgad, Senfa-Ar'ed (who all reigned for a total of 4 years)	Qedma Asgad (5) (1 year); Hezba Asgad (4) (1 year); Senfa Ared (3) (1 year)
Bahara-Asgad (5 years)	Saba Asgad (6) (1 year) (?)
Yagba-Asgad (9 years)	Yagbe'u Seyon (2) (9 years)
Amda-Seyon (30 years)	Amda Seyon I (9) (30 years)
Sayfa-Ar'ed (28 years)	Newaya Krestos (10) (28 years)
Germa Asfare (10 years)	Newaya Maryam (11) (10 years)
Dawit (33 years)	Dawit I (12) (31 years)
Tewodros (1 year)	Tewodros I (13) (9 months)
Yeshaq (15 years)	Yeshaq I (14) (15 years)
Endreyas (7 years)	Andreyas (15) (4 or 6 months)
Hezba-Nan, Amda Iyasus, Badel-Nan (who all reigned for a total of 5 years)	Takla Maryam (16) (3 years); Amda Iyasus (18) (8 months); Sarwe Iyasus (17) (4 or 8 months)
Zar'a Ya'qob (34 years)	Zara Yaqob (19) (34 years)
Ba'eda Mariam (10 years)	Baeda Maryam I (20) (10 years)
Eskender (17 years)	Eskender (21) (16 years)
Na'od (16 years)	Na'od (23) (14 years)
Amda Seyon	Amda Seyon II (22) (5 months)
Lebna Dengel	Lebna Dengel (24) (32 years)

The above list omits at least one of the sons of Yagbe'u Seyon. The second Amda Seyon is credited with having "fought ten kings and killed all of them", but this is likely a confusion with Amda Seyon I.

== 1922 regnal list ==
The longest regnal list of Ethiopian rulers was written in 1922 and contained 321 names from 4530 BC to 1779 AD. This list combines names from the majority of other regnal lists along with many additional names of rulers of ancient Nubia (which was often called Aethiopia historically) and ancient Egypt, as well as names that originate from the Biblical, ancient Greek, Coptic and Arabic literature. This regnal list first received attention in the Western world when it was published in Charles Fernand Rey's 1927 book In the Country of the Blue Nile after he had been given a copy by the Prince regent Tafari Makannon.

== See also ==
- 1922 regnal list of Ethiopia
- List of kings of Axum
- List of emperors of Ethiopia
- List of royal consorts of Ethiopia

== Bibliography ==
- Almeida, Manuel de (1710). The travels of the Jesuits in Ethiopia. Translated by John Stevens. London.
- Basset, René (1882). Études sur l'histoire d'Éthiopie. Paris.
- Bruce, James (1790). Travels to discover the source of the Nile, in the years 1768, 1769, 1770, 1771, 1772, and 1773: Volume II. Edinburgh.
- Budge, E. A. (1906). The Life of Takla Haymanot. London.
- Budge, E. A. (1928a). A History of Ethiopia: Nubia and Abyssinia (Volume I). London: Methuen & Co.
- Budge, E. A. (1928b). A History of Ethiopia: Nubia and Abyssinia (Volume II). London: Methuen & Co.
- Budge, E. A. (1922). Kebra Nagast: The Queen of Sheba and Her Only Son Menyelek.
- Combes, Edmond; Tamisier, Maurice (1838). Louis Desessart (ed.). Voyage en Abyssinie (in French). Paris.
- Dillmann, August (1853). "Zur Geschichte des abyssinischen Reichs". Zeitschrift der Deutschen Morgenländischen Gesellschaft (in German). 7 (3): 338–364.
- Drouin, E. (1882). "Les Listes Royales Éthiopiennes et leur Autorité Historique". Revue Archéologique (in French). 44: 99–115, 224. JSTOR 41746974.
- Edwards, Frederick A. (1918). "The Early Kings of Axum". The Asiatic Review. 14: 438–503.
- Huntingford, G.W.B. (1965). "The Wealth of Kings and the End of the Zāguē Dynasty". Bulletin of the School of Oriental and African Studies. 28 (1): 1–23. doi:10.1017/S0041977X00056731. JSTOR 611706. S2CID 161195803.
- Kammerer, Albert (1926). Essai sur l'histoire antique d'Abyssinie (in French). Paris.
- Kropp, Manfred (2006). "Ein später Schüler des Julius Africanus zu Beginn des 20. Jahrhunderts in Äthiopien". In Wallraf, Martin (ed.). Julius Africanus und die christliche Weltchronistik (in German). Berlin: Walter de Gruyter. ISBN 978-3-11-019105-9.
- Morié, Louis J. (1904). Histoire de L'Éthiopie (Nubie et Abyssinie): Histoire de L'Abyssinie (in French). Paris: A. Challamel.
- Páez, Pedro (2008). Isabel Boavida; Hervé Pennec; Manuel João Ramos (eds.). História da Etiópia (in Portuguese). Assirio & Alvim.
- Rey, C. F. (1927). In the Country of the Blue Nile. London: Camelot Press.
- Rüppell, Eduard (1840). Reise in Abyssinien: Zweiter Band. Frankfurt.
- Salt, Henry (1814). A Voyage to Abyssinia. London: W. Bulmer and Co.
- Selassie, Sergew Hable (1972). Ancient and Medieval Ethiopian History to 1270. Addis Ababa.
- Truhart, Peter (1984). Regents of Nations (Part 1). Munich: K. G. Saur. ISBN 3-598-10492-8.
- Tubiana, Joseph (1962). "Quatre généalogies royales éthiopiennes". Cahiers d'Études Africaines (in French). 2 (7): 491–508. JSTOR 4390812.
- Vittori, Mariano (1552). Chaldeae, seu Aethiopicae linguae institutiones (in Latin).
