= Ayzur =

King of Axum
- Reign: Late 8th century
- Predecessor: Gadagosh
- Successor: Dedem
- Born: Axum
- Spouse: Makia Maryam
- Issue: Dedem
- Father: Gadagosh

Ayzur or Izoor was a king of Axum who reigned for half a day according to the traditional regnal lists.

== Background ==
Ayzur reigned for a notably short time compared to other Axumite kings. He died due to suffocation caused by a crowd gathering around him on the day he was crowned. Afterwards it became illegal for Ethiopians to approach the future Axumite kings.

The exact chronological position of Ayzur's reign is inconsistent across Axumite regnal lists. In 1620 Pedro Páez recorded two regnal lists where Ayzur is mentioned. The first list places him between kings named Aderaaz and Maadai. The second list instead names his successor as Dil Na'od, the king usually considered the last to rule Axum. A list quoted by James Bruce likewise places Ayzur between Aderaaz and Dil Na'od.

A more common chronological position for this king is between king Gadagosh and king Dedem. Egyptologist Henry Salt recorded a list where king Ayzur (named "Izoor") reigned between "Woddo Gush" and "Didum". A list recorded by René Basset similarly placed Ayzur between kings "'Oda Sasa" and "Dedem". Another list quoted by Carlo Conti Rossini placed Ayzur between "'Adhsha" and "'Awdamdem".

The Ethiopian monarchy's official 1922 regnal list followed the later chronological placement for Ayzur, where he was placed between Gadagosh and Dedem. This regnal list calls this king "Aizar Eskikatir", the latter word meaning "until noon".

== Date of reign ==
Most regnal lists that include Ayzur do not provide any dates for when his reign was said to have occurred. It is only certain that he reigned at some point between Kaleb of Axum in the early 6th century and Dil Na'od in the 10th century.

The 1922 regnal list dated Ayzur's half-day reign to the year 780 in the Ethiopian calendar (which is seven or eight years behind the Gregorian calendar). Peter Truhart's 1984 book Regents of Nations dated Ayzur's reign to 775 in the Gregorian calendar.

== Family and successors ==
According to a text named Tarika Nagast, held in the church of Debre Damo, the kings from Kaleb to Dil Na'od were each the son of the previous king, suggesting that Ayzur was the son of king Gadagosh and father of king Dedem. A regnal list quoted by August Dillmann explicitly names Ayzur as the father of Dedem.

One manuscript from Gojjam claims that Ayzur was the father of Gudit and had a wife named Makia Maryam who was Gudit's mother. The same manuscript claims that Ayzur reigned two decades before king Wedem Asfare.
