= Book of Axum =

Collection of documents on Ethiopian history

The Book of Axum (Ge'ez መጽሐፈ ፡ አክሱም maṣḥafa aksūm, Amharic: meṣhafe aksūm, Tigrinya: meṣḥafe aksūm, Latin: Liber Axumae) is the name accepted since the time of James Bruce in the latter part of the 18th century CE for a collection of documents from Saint Mary's Cathedral of Axum providing information on the history of Ethiopia. The earliest parts of the collection date to the mid-15th century during the reign of Zar'a Ya`qob (r. 1434–1468).

The book's editor Carlo Conti Rossini classified the book into three parts: the first, earlier, section describes the Church Maryam Seyon in Axum prior to it being damaged in the mid-16th century, the topography of Axum and its history, and contains a list of services and the like regarding Maryam Seyon and its clergy. The second part is dated to the early 17th century and contains 104 historical and legal texts, many dealing with land grants, along with their protocols, while the third text dates to the late 17th century and contains 14 miscellaneous legal and historical texts regarding Axum's history. The book was also supplemented in the mid-19th century with further later documents.

The book derives the name Ethiopia from Itiyopp'is, an (otherwise unmentioned) son of the Biblical Cush. According to the Book of Axum Itiyopp'is built Mazaber, the Kingdom of Axum's first capital.

== See also ==
- Church of Our Lady Mary of Zion
- Ethiopian historiography
- History of Ethiopia
