= Ramhay =

King of Axum
- Reign: c. 330s–320s BCE
- Predecessor: Safay
- Successor: Hande or Safelya
- Born: Axum

Ramhay was a King of Axum whose name is recorded on various Axumite king lists and reigned at some point in the BCE era. One unpublished source claims he was a contemporary of Alexander the Great. He has also been recorded under the names Rami and Ramhaya on some lists.

== Background ==
=== Regnal lists ===
Ramhay is recorded on a number of regnal lists that claim to present a list of Axumite kings from the time of Menelik I, who was the son of Makeda, the Queen of Sheba, and Solomon according to the Kebra Nagast.

Orientalists August Dillmann and Carlo Conti Rossini both attempted to co-ordinate and compare the large number of surviving regnal lists from modern day Ethiopia and Eritrea in various types. Dillmann categorised the lists into three types, known as A, B and C, while Rossini categorised 86 different lists into eight groups, known as lists A to H. Both authors' lists B match with each other.

Ramhay is named on Rossini's lists B, E and H, with list B being the mostly widely recorded of these. Dillmann found this list in four sources, while Rossini found it in thirty-three sources dating to the 16th to 19th centuries. List E was found in only one place, the Monastery of Enda Sellasé in Akele Guzai in Eritrea. List H is based on three manuscripts but is noticeably different from the other seven variations recorded by Rossini.

Ramhay on traditional Ethiopian and Eritrean regnal lists
List	Predecessor	Successor	Statements and Notes	Ref.
B	Safay	Hande	17th king to reign after Menelik I.	
E	Safay	Safalya	16th king to reign after Menelik I.	
H	Safay	"Ahow"	13th king to reign after Menelik I. Reigned for 15 years.	

On all three lists his predecessor is a king named Safay or Sayfay, while his successor differs depending on the list. The name "Ahow" on list H is likely an error, as this word means "brothers", suggesting that Safay and Ramhay were brothers according to this list.

On the 1922 regnal list, as quoted by then-Prince Regent Tafari Makonnen, Ramhay appears twice, under the names "Ramhay Nastossanan" and "Ramhay Arkamen", reflecting his position on Rossini's lists B and E. The 1922 list added names of Kushite monarchs to names of Axumite rulers from earlier lists, due to the identification of the name of "Aethiopia" with the Kingdom of Kush in Greco-Roman and Biblical sources. The names of the Kushite kings Nastasen and Arakamani were associated with Ramhay on this list, but did not appear on earlier regnal lists.

=== Dating ===
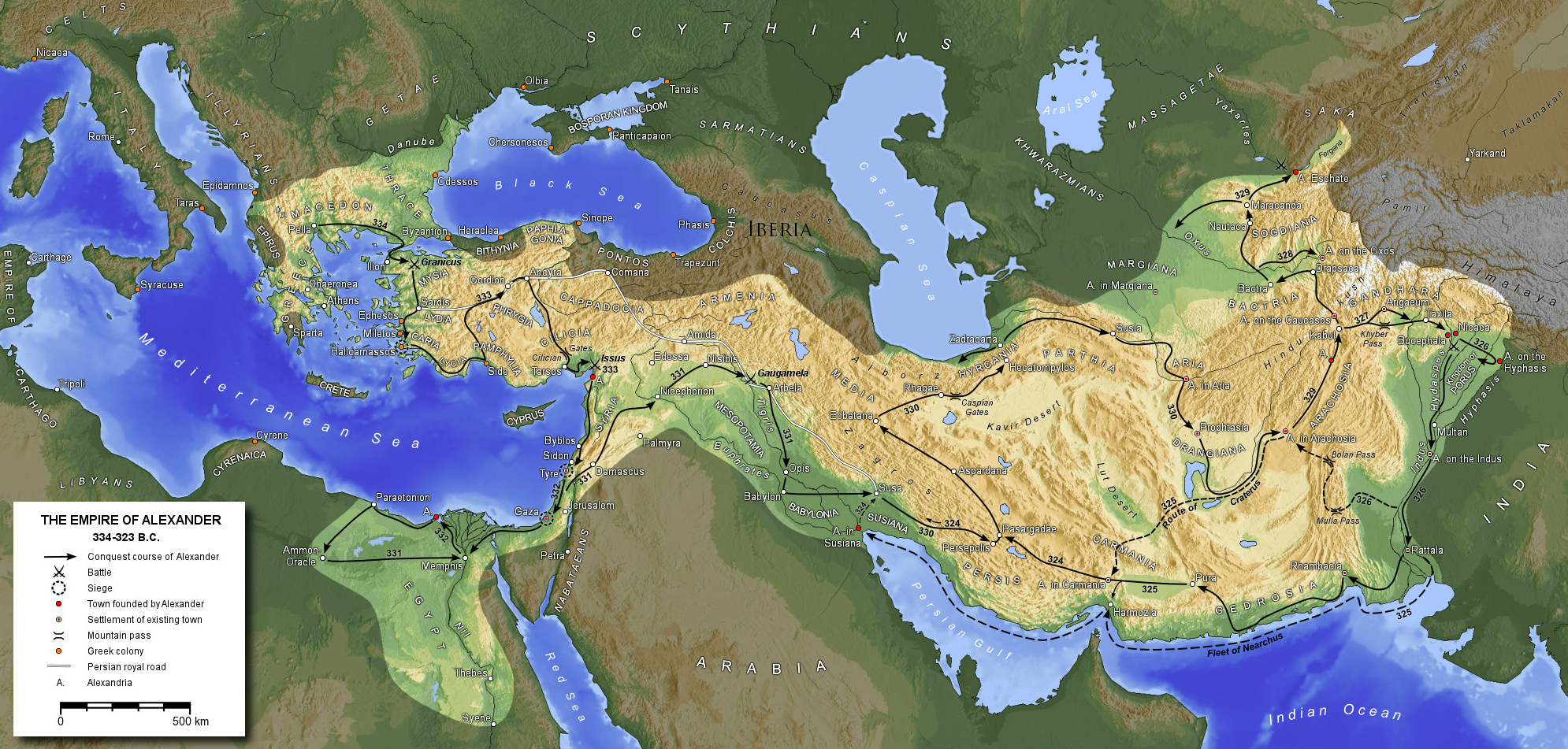
Alexander's empire.

According to an unpublished chronicle from Axum, Ramhay reigned at the time of Alexander the Great and asked for Greek technicians and engineers to build palaces, monuments, and stelae, one of which was destroyed centuries later by Gudit. If accurate, this dating would place Ramhay's reign in the 330s or 320s BCE. Alexander conquered Egypt in 332 BC and died in 323 BC. Ramhay's reign must have taken place between these two dates.

The 1922 regnal list dates the two kings named Ramhay to 556–542 BC and 232–222 BC respectively, with dates following the Ethiopian calendar. However, neither of these reign dates coincide with the time of Alexander the Great's rule over Egypt.

== See also ==
- List of kings of Axum
- Regnal lists of Ethiopia

== Bibliography ==
- Budge, E. A. (1906). The Life of Takla Haymanot. London.
- Dillmann, August (1853). "Zur Geschichte des abyssinischen Reichs". Zeitschrift der Deutschen Morgenländischen Gesellschaft (in German). 7 (3): 338–364.
- Edwards, Frederick A. (1918). "The Early Kings of Axum". The Asiatic Review. 14: 438–503.
- Rey, C. F. (1927). In the Country of the Blue Nile. London: Camelot Press.
- Salt, Henry (1814). A Voyage to Abyssinia. London: W. Bulmer and Co.
- Selassie, Sergew Hable (1972a). Ancient and Medieval Ethiopian History to 1270. Addis Ababa.
- Sellassie, Sergew Hable (1972b). "The Problem of Gudit". Journal of Ethiopian Studies. 10 (1): 113–124. ISSN 0304-2243. JSTOR 41965849.
