= Angabo =

Angabo አንጋቦ
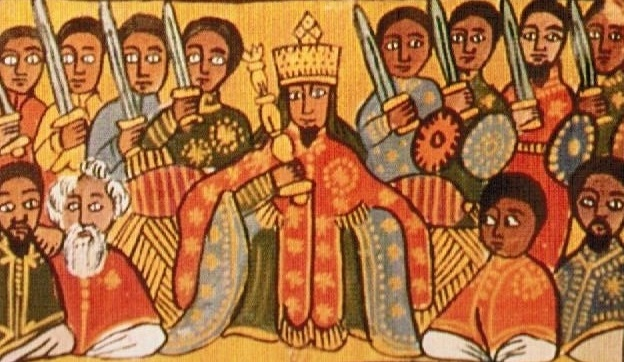

King of Ethiopia (traditional)
- Reign: 14th century BC
- Predecessor: Arwe or Sebado
- Successor: Zagdur or Makeda
- Spouse: Makeda (some traditions)
- Issue: Makeda (some traditions); Zagdur (some traditions)
- Dynasty: Ag'azyan dynasty (according to the 1922 regnal list)
- Father: Adhana

Angabo or Agabos (vocalized Ge'ez: አንጋቦ, romanized: 'ängabo) was a legendary king of Ethiopia who killed the evil serpent king Arwe and was either the father or husband of the Queen of Sheba (known as Makeda to Ethiopians). He was sometimes called Za Besi Angabo.

== Traditions ==
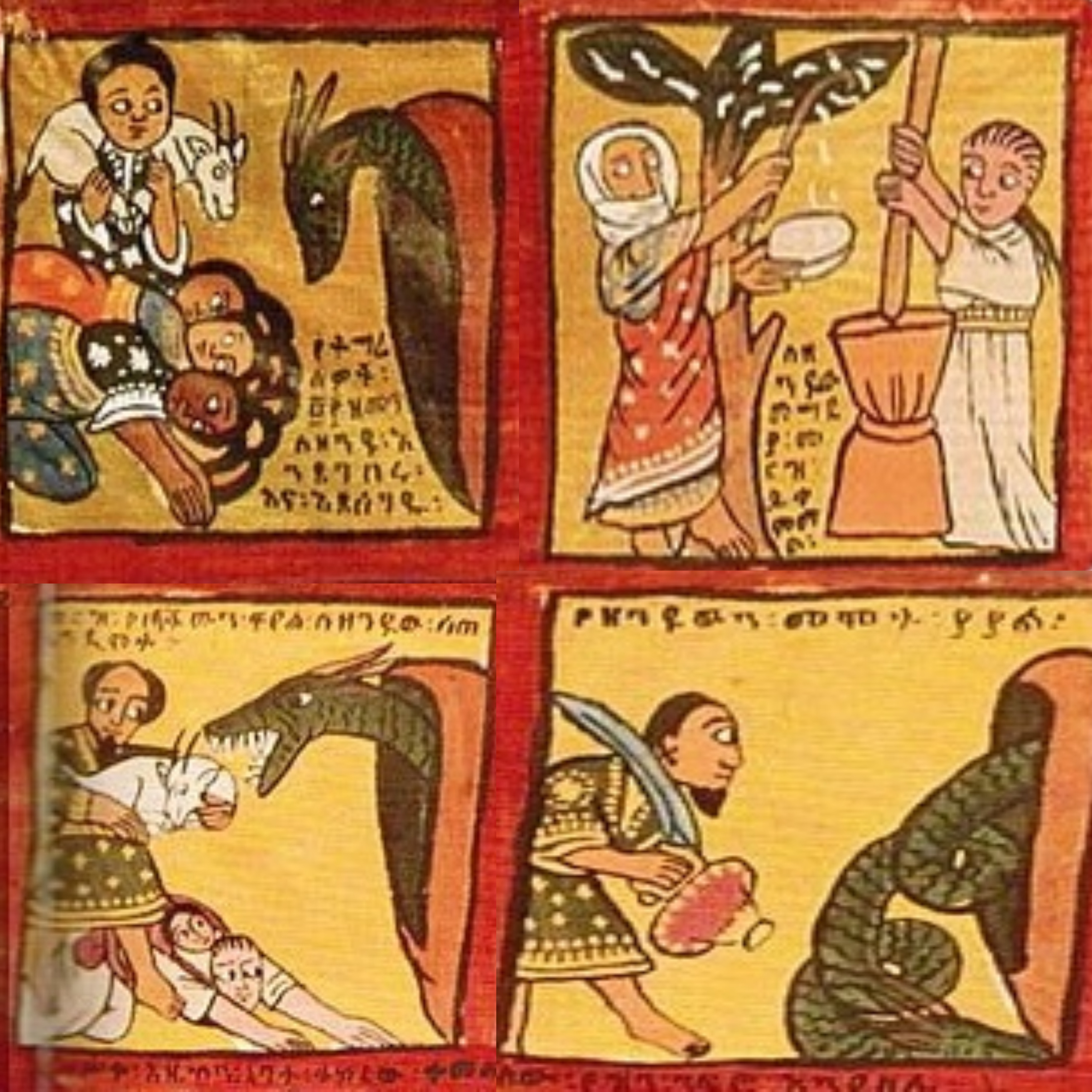
Angabo killing Arwe

Angabo is commonly credited with killing an evil serpent called Arwe or Wainaba. Arwe ruled Ethiopia in ancient times for 400 years, during which time Ethiopians had to sacrifice their virgin daughters and cattle to satisfy his hunger. In one version of the Arwe myth, a stranger arrives in Ethiopia and sees a woman crying because she has to give her daughter as sacrifice to Arwe, which results in the stranger offering to kill the serpent. He offers Arwe a lamb and a juice made from the poisonous Euphorbia tree, which causes Arwe's death. As reward for defeating the serpent, the people offer Angabo the chance to become their ruler, which he accepts.

In another version of the myth, Wainaba, the serpent ruler, traveled north from Tamben to Axum, when he is attacked and killed by Angabo with fire. Angabo had promised the Axumites he would kill the serpent in exchange for the throne, and used various forms of magic on the road that Wainaba was traveling on, including putting an iron instrument under the road. According to legend, Wainaba was buried in May Wayno, where his grave is still located.

== Family ==
Angabo was of non-royal origin. According to Alaqa Taye Gabra Mariam Angabo was the son of a man named Adhana.

Angabo's relations to Makeda, the Biblical Queen of Sheba, vary according to the tradition. In one version, she was the daughter of king "Za Sebado" and was married to Angabo after he rescued her before she could be sacrificed to Arwe. In another tradition, he was instead the father of Makeda, who ascended to the throne after him.

Angabo was sometimes considered the founder of a new dynasty, with Makeda as one of his descendants. According to this tradition, he was succeeded by a king named Zagdur or Gedur. Afterwards, this king was succeeded by king Sebado and then king Kawnasya, who was the father of Makeda.

The 1922 regnal list of Ethiopia numbers Angabo as the 74th ruler of Ethiopia and places him as part of the Semitic Ag'azyan dynasty, succeeding king Senuka II and preceding king Miamur. Monarchs named Zagdur, Sagado, Tawasya and Makeda are also part of this dynasty, but not as immediate successors of Angabo. The same list also named a second king named Angabo who reigned 132 years after Angabo I.

French historian Albert Kammerer theorised the name "Angabo" was the name of a tribe or dynasty instead of only one person.

== Reign length and dates ==
Angabo appears on some Ethiopian regnal lists as one of the kings who reigned before Menelik I.

Some traditions claim Angabo ruled Ethiopia for 200 years. The 1922 regnal list reduced his reign length to 50 years.

Some sources claim he founded a new dynasty in 1370 BC. The 1922 regnal list dated his reign to 1408–1358 BC, with dates following the Ethiopian calendar, which is seven or eight years behind the Gregorian calendar.

== See also ==
- Arwe
- Queen of Sheba
- Regnal lists of Ethiopia
