= Wedem Asfare =

King of Axum
- Reign: c. 792–822
- Predecessor: Wededem
- Successor: Armah
- Born: Axum
- Issue: Armah
- Father: Wededem

Wedem Asfare or Wudme Asfare is the name of a king who appears on various Axumite king lists. His exact reign dates are unknown, but some historians believe he ruled from the late 8th century to the early 9th century.

== Reign dates and reign length ==
Wedem Asfare is usually named as the successor of king Wededem or Dedem and predecessor of king Armah. Ethiopian historian Sergew Hable Selassie estimated Wedem Asfare's reign dates to be c. 792–822, while the Ethiopian monarchy's 1922 king list dates his reign to 795–825, with dates following the Ethiopian calendar. John Stewart, in his book African States and Rulers, dated Wedem Asfare's reign to 790–820. While 30 years is the most common reign length ascribed to this king, some king lists claim he ruled for up to 150 years.

Sergew Hable Selassie felt that the true reign dates could differ by as much as 100 years compared to written sources.

== Relation to other Axumite rulers ==
According to a text named Tarika Nagast, the kings from Kaleb to Dil Na'od were each the son of the previous king, meaning that Wedem Asfare was the son of king Wededem.

An unpublished chronicle from Axum states that Wedem Asfare was the grandfather of the infamous queen Gudit, who sacked Axum in the 10th century. According to this chronicle, she was descended from Wedem Asfare through his daughter. Other sources however claim different origins for Gudit, so it remains unclear if she was indeed related to the Axumite royal family.

== Legacy ==
The name "Wedem Asfare" was used as the throne name of Ethiopian emperor Newaya Maryam (r. 1372–1382).
