= Degna Djan =

9th-century emperor of the Axumite Empire

- Negus of Axum

King of Aksum
- Reign: 837?-857?
- Predecessor: 'Armah
- Successor: Anbasa Wedem
- Issue: Anbasa Wedem; Dil Na'od

Degna Djan was an emperor of the Kingdom of Aksum (9th or 10th century). Paul B. Henze states that his throne name was "'Anbasa Wedem", which tradition states was his oldest son's name. His younger son was Dil Na'od.

E. A. Wallis Budge provides an account of the most familiar tradition about Degna Djan on his deathbed, that he asked Abuna Peter to decide which of his two sons should succeed him. Abuna Peter selected Dil Na'od. Upset with the decision, 'Anbasa Wedem is said to have bribed an Egyptian monk Mennas to go to Alexandria and convince the Patriarch of Alexandria to remove Abuna Peter so 'Anbasa Wedem could claim the throne. Mennas returned with forged papers that made him Abuna, and he consecrated 'Anbasa Wedem as king. Dil Na'od's supporters thereupon collected troops and deposed 'Anasa Wedem upon learning the truth. Patriarch Cosmas excommunicated Mennas, but Mennas had died by that time.

Taddesse Tamrat repeats traditions that Degna Djan both led military expeditions as far south as Ennarea, and commanded missionary activities in the highlands of Angot and the later province of Amhara. Because the Gadla of Tekle Haymanot states that Degna Djan lived 18 generations, or 400–600 years, before the saint (c. 1215), "this brings Digna-Jan to the first half of the ninth century."

Taddesse Tamrat also mentions a tradition that makes him, not his son Dil Na'od, the last king of Axum. One tradition states Degnan Djan perished in one of his southern campaigns.

Regnal titles
Preceded by Armah II	King of Axum	Succeeded by 'Anbasa Wedem
