= Mairari =

Negus (king) of Ethiopia

Mairari was negus of Ethiopia, and some records list him as a member of the Zagwe dynasty. Little is known about his reign, which E.A. Wallis Budge states lasted 15 or 18 years. Budge wrote that Mairari died around 1308; other authorities date his death before 1270, when Yekuno Amlak became ruler.
