= Ethiopis =

Legendary Ethiopian king

Ethiopis or Itiyopp'is is the name of a legendary king from Ethiopian tradition who was the inspiration behind the name of the country, Ethiopia.

According to an Ethiopian tradition, the term Ethiopia is derived from the word Ethiopis, a name of the Ethiopian king, the seventh in the ancestral lines. Metshafe Aksum or the Ethiopian Book of Aksum identifies Itiopis as the twelfth king of Ethiopia and the father of Aksumawi. The Ethiopians pronounce Ethiopia እትዮጵያ with a Sades or the sixth sound እ as in incorporate and the graph ጰ has no equivalent in English or Latin graphs. Ethiopis is believed to be the twelfth direct descendant of Adam. His father is identified as Kush, while his grandfather is known as Kam.

== Traditions ==
=== Hamitic dynasty ===
One tradition states that this king was descended from Cush, son of Ham and grandson of Noah. This tradition further claims that Ethiopis' descendants included his son Aksumawi, grandson Malayka Aksum, and great-grandsons Sum, Nafaz, Bagi'o, Kuduki, Akhoro and Farheba. This genealogy suggests a connection between Ethiopia and the Nubian kingdom of Kush, as represented by Ethiopis being the son of Cush. Aksumani, the son of Ethiopis, is likely meant to represent the kingdom of Axum, which ruled from the 1st to the 10th century A.D. over parts of modern-day Ethiopia and Eritrea.

The Book of Axum claims that Ethiopis was the twelfth king of Ethiopia. The Book of Axum also claims that he built Mazabar, Ethiopia's first capital. One Ethiopian tradition claims that Ethiopis was buried in Axum and fire used to burn in his grave.

Egyptologist E. A. Wallis Budge noted that some Ethiopian king lists name Ethiopis as the very first king of Ethiopia.

=== Sabaean dynasty ===
The official chronicle of the Ethiopian monarchy from 1922, written by the then prince regent Tafari Makannon, includes a different tradition. According to this king list, two kings named Etiyopus ruled during the 17th and 18th centuries B.C. as part of the Agdazyan dynasty which descended from Sheba, who himself was a descendant of Ham according to the Table of Nations. Etiyopus I reigned from 1856 to 1800 B.C. (Ethiopian calendar), preceded by king Sabe II and succeeded by king Lakndun Nowarari. Etiyopus II reigned from 1730 to 1700 B.C. (Ethiopian calendar), preceded by Her Hator I and succeeded by Senuka I. The relations of these two kings with their predecessors and successors is not made clear on the king list and their names certainly do not match with the names of Ethiopis' descendants mentioned in the previous tradition. However, the Ethiopian queen Cassiopeia of ancient Greek myth is mentioned earlier as part of the same dynasty and thus may be intended to be perceived as an ancestor of Ethiopis.

=== Roman tradition ===
Pliny the Elder stated that Ethiopis or "Aethiops" was the son of the Roman god Vulcan.

== Origins of the word "Ethiopia" ==
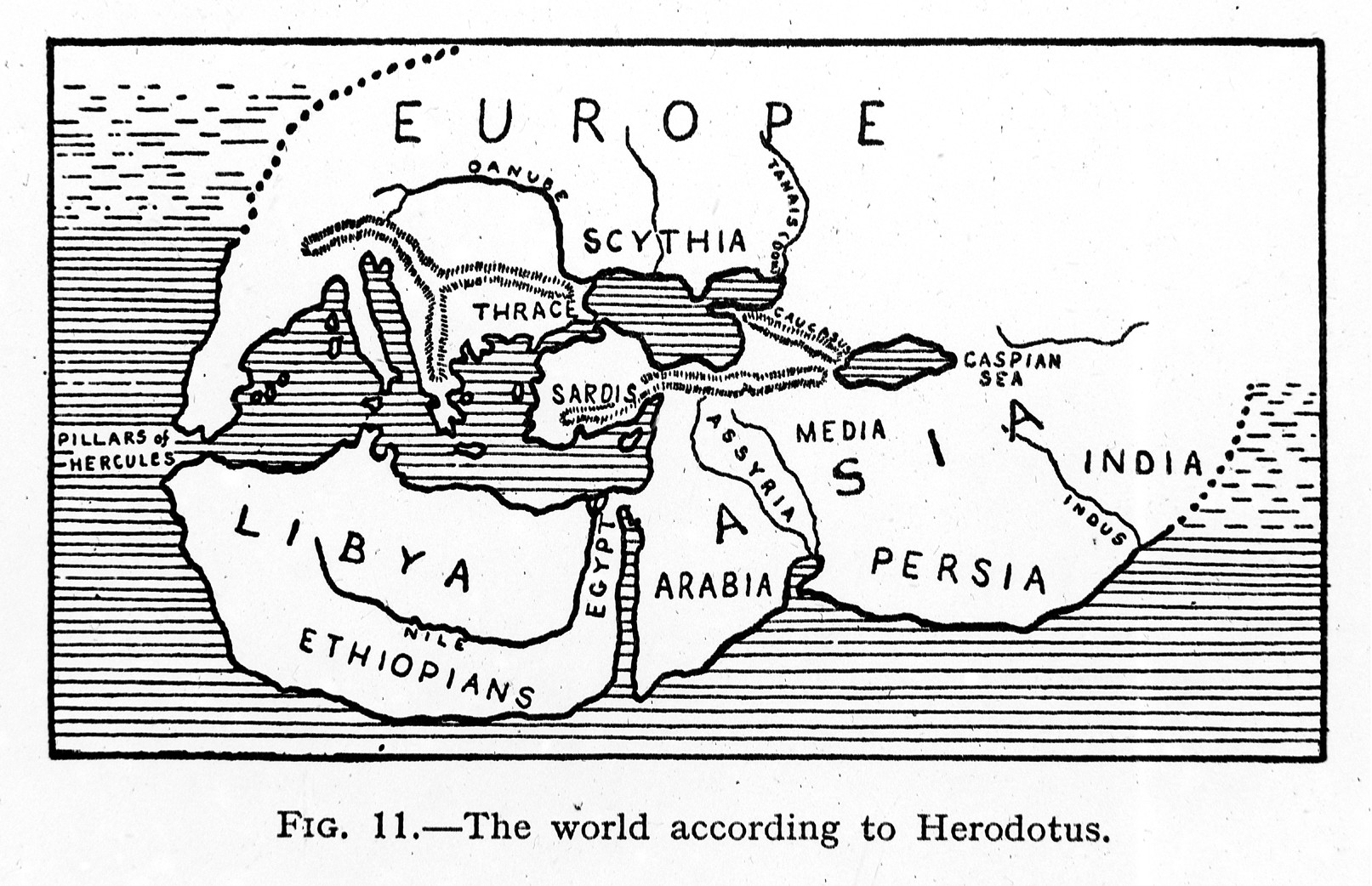
Map of the world according to Herodotus showing the location of the "Ethiopians" south of Egypt.

Some Ethiopian traditions trace the word "Ethiopia" to Itan, a Ge'ez word for incense, a reference to the Ethiopian plateau which has long traded in incense.

Despite Ethiopian traditions claiming a native origin for the country's name, many Western historians disbelieve Ethiopians and instead claim the word "Aethiopia" must be of Western, specifically Greek, origin. Greek historian Herodotus used the word to refer to parts of Sub-Saharan Africa that were known to the Greeks at the time, specifically all inhabited land south of Egypt. It had also been used as a vague term for dark-skinned peoples since the time of Homer.

In ancient times, "Ethiopia" often referred to the Kingdom of Kush in modern-day Sudan rather than strictly the territory of modern-day Ethiopia. Herodotus specifically named Meroe as the capital of "Aethiopia". He also noted that there had been eighteen Ethiopian kings and one Ethiopian queen who ruled Egypt. The Egyptian priest Manetho described this dynasty as being made up of "Ethiopian kings". When the Hebrew Bible was translated to Greek in c. 200 B.C. the term "Kush, Kushite" became "Aethiopia, Aethiopians".

According to George Hatke, the reason why the territory of modern-day Ethiopia today claims this name may be due to the conquest of Meroe by the Aksumite Empire (located in modern-day Ethiopia and Eritrea) in the 4th century A.D., after which the Axumites began referring to themselves as "Ethiopians". This was likely due to the Biblical usage of the word "Ethiopian" and a desire for the newly Christianized Axumites to form a connection with Biblical tradition.

E. A. Wallis Budge theorised that one of the reasons why the name "Ethiopia" was applied to Abyssinia was because Syrian monks identified Kush and Nubia with Abyssinia when translating the Bible from Greek to Ge'ez. Budge further noted that the translators of the Ethiopic Bible from the 5th and 6th centuries had identified Kush with Abyssinia for centuries and that this interpretation was accepted by the modern day people of the region. He argued that it was unlikely that the "Ethiopians" mentioned in ancient Greek writings were the Abyssinians, but instead were far more likely to be the Nubians of Meroë.

== See also ==
- List of legendary monarchs of Ethiopia
