= Dil Na'od =

King of Aksum from 917 to 960

- Negus of Axum

King of Aksum
- Reign: 917–960
- Predecessor: Anbasa Wedem
- Successor: Position abolished
- Issue: Masoba Warq; Abeto Mehabere Widam
- Father: Degna Djan

Dil Na'od was the last King of Aksum before the Zagwe dynasty. He lived in either the 9th or 10th century. Dil Na'od was the younger son of Ged'a Jan (or Degna Djan), and succeeded his older brother 'Anbasa Wedem as negus. According to E. A. Wallis Budge, "The reign of Delna'ad was short, perhaps about ten years." However, James Bruce has recorded another tradition, that Dil Na'od was an infant when Gudit slaughtered the princes imprisoned at Debre Damo, his relatives, and forced some of his nobles to take him out of his kingdom to save his life.

Dil Na'od is recorded as both campaigning in the Ethiopian Highlands south of Axum, and sending missionaries into that region. With Abuna Salama I, he helped to build the church of Debre Igziabher overlooking Lake Hayq.

According to one tradition, he was defeated by Mara Takla Haymanot, a prince from Lasta province, who married Dil Na'od's daughter, Masaba Warq. According to tradition, a son of Dil Na'od was carried to Amhara, that son being Abeto Mehabere Widam, where he was harbored until his descendant, Yekuno Amlak, overthrew the Zagwe Kingdom, and re-established the Solomonic dynasty.

Dil'Naod is credited with building and establishing the original structures for both the church of Debre Egzi-'abhēr & Istifanos Monastery at Lake Hayq.

Regnal titles
Preceded by Anbasa Wedem	King of Axum	Succeeded by Mara Takla Haymanot as King of the Zagwe
