= Carlo Conti Rossini =

Italian orientalist (1872–1949)

- Born: 1872; Salerno, Italy
- Died: 1949 (aged 76–77); Rome, Italy

Academic work
- Main interests: Ethiopia

Carlo Conti Rossini (1872–1949) was an Italian orientalist.

He was director of the State Treasury from 1917 to 1925, a member of the Accademia dei Lincei in 1921 and Royal Academy of Italy from 1939. He wrote various works on the historical geography of Ethiopia, of which the most famous is Italia ed Etiopia dal trattato di Uccialli alla battaglia d'Adua (Italy and Ethiopia from the Treaty of Uccialli to the Battle of Adwa, 1935). He also wrote articles on phonetic Ethiopian (Tigrinya Language, 1940). His library is preserved in Rome.
