= Ethiopia in the Middle Ages =

History of Ethiopia from 7th to 16th centuries

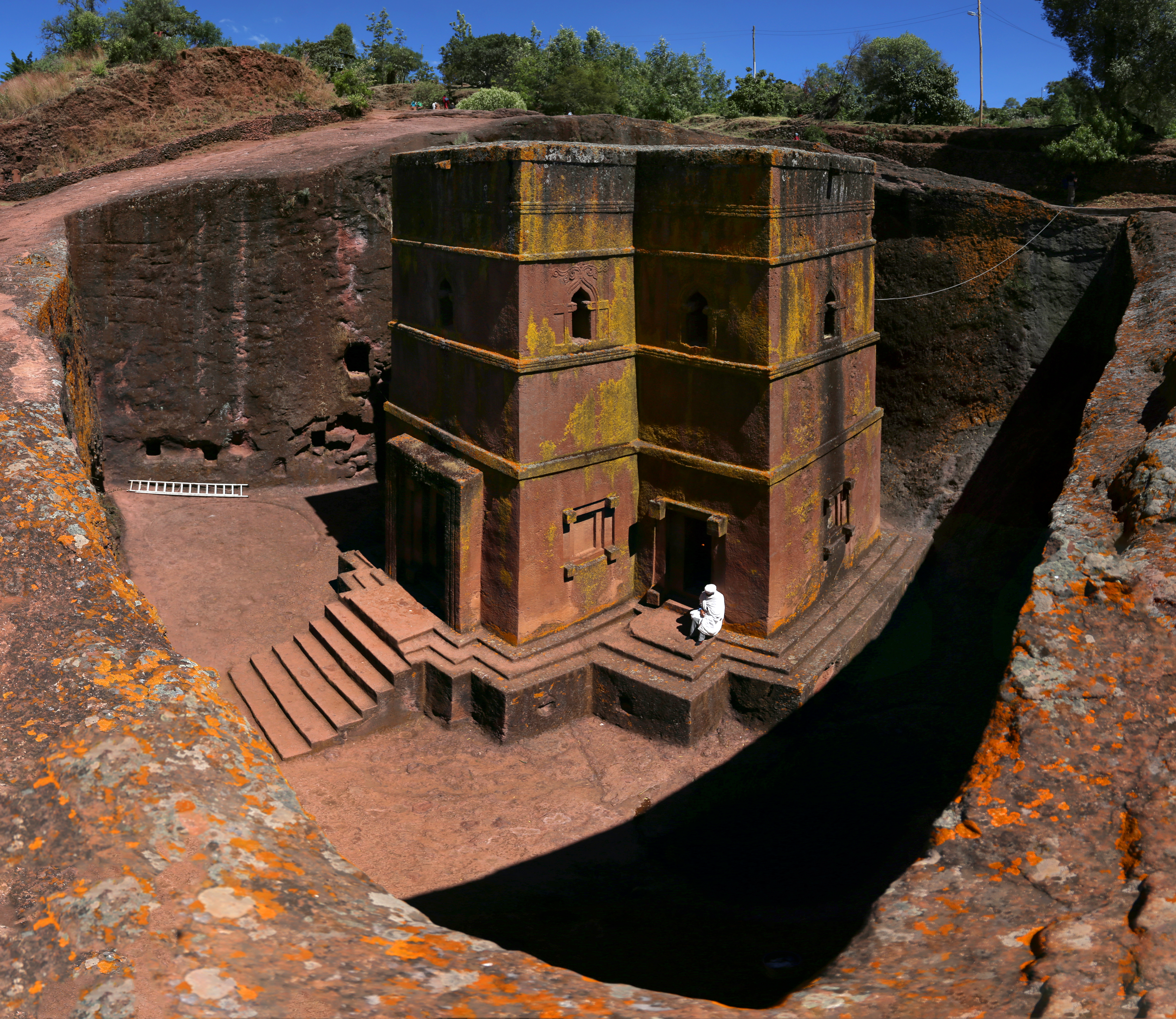
The Church of Saint George, one of the Zagwe-era rock-hewn churches at Lalibela.

The history of Ethiopia in the Middle Ages (Note: For simplicity, "Ethiopia" can be taken to include Eritrea, which was not a defined entity until the colonial era.) roughly spans the period from the decline of the Kingdom of Aksum in the 7th century to the Gondarine period beginning in the 17th century. Aksum had been a powerful empire during late antiquity, appearing in the Periplus of the Erythraean Sea and mentioned by Iranian prophet Mani as one of the "four great kingdoms on earth", along with the Sasanian Empire of Persia, the Roman Empire, and China's Three Kingdoms. The kingdom was an integral part of the trade route between Rome and the Indian subcontinent, had substantial cultural ties to the Greco-Roman world, and was a very early adopter of Christianity under Ezana of Aksum in the mid-4th century. The use of "Ethiopia" to refer to the region dates back to the 4th century. At its height, the kingdom spanned what is now Eritrea, northern Ethiopia, eastern Sudan, Yemen and the southern part of what is now Saudi Arabia. However, by the 7th century, the kingdom had begun a slow decline, for which several possible political, economic, and ecological reasons have been proposed. This decline, which has been termed the "Post-Aksumite Period", saw extreme loss of territory and lasted until the ascension of the Zagwe dynasty.

In the late 10th century, the Kingdom of Aksum fell to a queen known as Gudit. Historians are unsure of her ethnicity and religion, but she is theorized to have been Agaw and likely non-Christian, as she targeted churches in her attacks. Confusion surrounds the period directly following her reign, but the dynasty proper is considered to have been founded by Mara Takla Haymanot in 1137. The capital moved southward from Aksum to Lalibela, where many rock-hewn churches were built. Despite the anti-Christian nature of Gudit's takeover, Christianity flourished under Zagwe rule but its territorial extent was markedly smaller than that of the Aksumites, controlling the area between Lasta and the Red Sea.

The Zagwe dynasty was overthrown in 1270 by Yekuno Amlak, whose successors came to be known as the Solomonic dynasty. The Kebra Nagast, a 14th-century national epic, established the dynasty's claim of direct descent from Solomon, recounting the story of Solomon and the Queen of Sheba, whose child was supposedly Menelik I. The Semitic Amhara rulers of the Solomonic dynasty therefore represented a restoration of the Israelite lineage of the Aksumites, as opposed to the Cushitic Zagwe rulers, who were viewed in retrospect as illegitimate. In the nearly 150 years between the reigns of Amda Seyon I and Zara Yaqob, the Solomonic emperors made significant territorial expansions into non-Christian lands to the south, west, and east of the highlands, conquering much of the territory that comprises modern-day Ethiopia. Despite enormous expansions and the successful spread of Christianity, Ethiopia was invaded by Adal, supported by the Ottoman Empire, in 1531. It was not until 1540 that Ethiopia began to regain its territory with the support of the Portuguese Empire. Ethiopia's weakened state after the war left it susceptible to the Oromo migrations, in which the Oromo people of southern Ethiopia began to expand northward and established permanent settlements. This altered political and cultural landscape is seen as the beginning of the modern era in Ethiopia. From a historiographical perspective, the Middle Ages are a mysterious period of Ethiopian history, as there was comparatively little contact with foreign nations versus the ancient and modern periods.

== Political history ==
=== Post-Aksumite Period (7th–10th centuries) ===
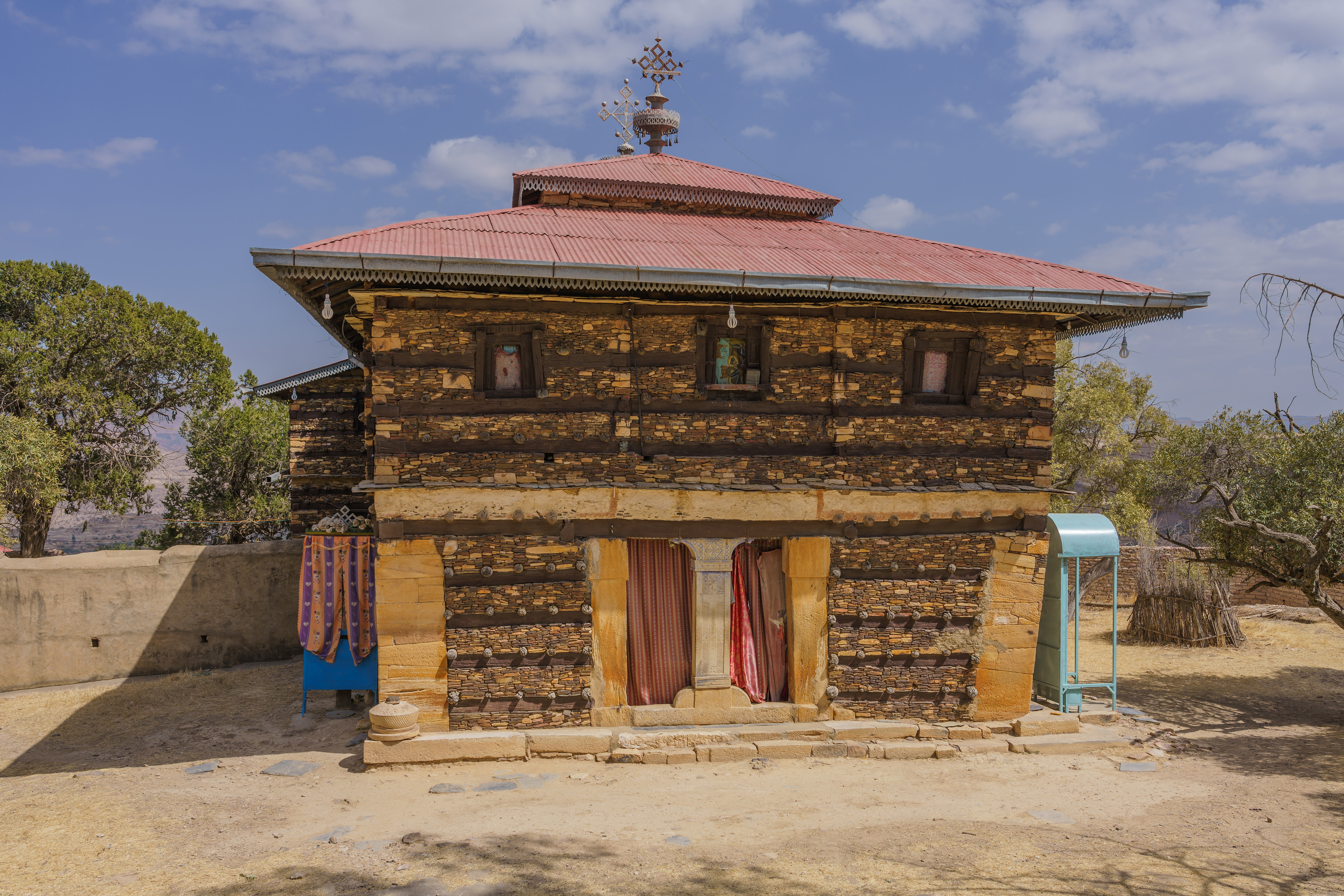
Debre Damo, a monastery built in the 6th century, shortly before the Post-Aksumite Period.

As an early Christian nation, the Kingdom of Aksum enjoyed close diplomatic relations with the Byzantine Empire. Across the Red Sea, the Himyarite Kingdom had become a Jewish state, persecuting Christians under the rule of Dhu Nuwas. Byzantine emperor Justin I called upon Kaleb of Aksum for assistance to the Himyarite Christians, and the Aksumite invasion occurred in 525. The invasion was successful, enlarging the Kingdom of Aksum to its greatest territorial extent. However, Aksumite rule in the region was turbulent, and the territory was lost to the Sasanian Empire in the Aksumite–Persian wars less than 50 years later. With a Persian presence established in South Arabia, Aksum no longer dominated Red Sea trade; this situation only worsened following the Muslim conquest of Persia in the 7th century.

Archaeological evidence suggests that the population of the city of Aksum began to diminish in the 7th century. Around the same time, the kingdom appears to have ceased the minting of gold coins, indicating a withdrawal from international trade. This has been attributed to the aforementioned Persian and Muslim expansions, though other additional factors have been proposed as well. Historical records regarding the water levels of the Nile in Egypt indicate that the Ethiopian Highlands received less rainfall at the time, Aksum was among the nations affected by the first plague pandemic, and destruction of stelae from this time suggest internal unrest. The final three centuries of the Kingdom of Aksum are considered a dark age by historians, offering little in the way of written and archaeological records.

=== Zagwe dynasty (10th century–1270) ===
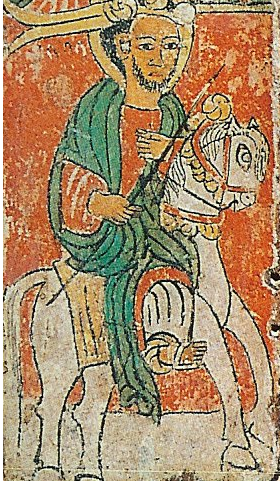
15th-century painting of Lalibela, the emperor credited with the construction of the rock-hewn churches in Lalibela and the namesake of the town.

In the late 10th century, external documents refer to a queen ruling over the land of "al-Ḥabaša" (Abyssinia). The documents state that the queen (referred to in one document as queen of the "Bani al-Hamwiyah") killed the king of Ethiopia, and suggest that she had seized power at least as early as the 960s. No religion or ethnic group has been decisively identified with Bani al-Hamwiyah, but the queen, who is known as Gudit, was certainly non-Christian, as her reign was characterized by the destruction of churches in Ethiopia which is seen as opposition to the spread of Christianity in the region. The Ethiopian Orthodox Tewahedo Church, which was subordinate to the Coptic Orthodox Church of Alexandria, had not been sent a metropolitan from Alexandria for many years during the 10th century. However, after Gudit's reign had ended, the succeeding Ethiopian king reached out to Pope Philotheos of Alexandria regarding the deteriorated situation, and Philotheos subsequently re-established relations between Egypt and Ethiopia. This set the scene for a Christian renaissance in Ethiopia.

Though the Aksumite era was ended by Gudit, the Zagwe dynasty was not established until 1137 by Mara Takla Haymanot. The Zagwe kings, who are thought to be Agaw, moved the capital south to Lalibela, which itself is named after the Ethiopian emperor of the same name. Under Lalibela's reign, the construction of eleven rock-hewn churches began. Though Christianity experienced growth in this period, Ethiopia's territory diminished significantly since the fall of the Kingdom of Aksum, centred primarily on the Ethiopian highlands between Lasta and Tigray. The kingdom of Medri Bahri, which controlled the Red Sea coast in modern-day Eritrea, was a client state of Ethiopia.

=== Early Solomonic dynasty (1270–mid-16th century) ===
The Zagwe dynasty came to an end in 1270, after Yekuno Amlak overthrew them and established what came to be known as the Solomonic dynasty. The Kebra Nagast, a 14th-century national epic, describes the dynasty's claim to descent from Solomon, and was used to justify the takeover from the Zagwe dynasty. The epic states that the Kingdom of Aksum was founded by Menelik I, who was allegedly the son of Solomon and the Queen of Sheba, known as Makeda in Ethiopia. By connecting Yekuno Amlak to this ancestry, it was seen as authority for the dynasty to rule Ethiopia. In contrast, the Cushitic Zagwe kings were not seen as part of this lineage, and were denounced as illegitimate rulers.

One of the defining features of Ethiopia under the Solomonic dynasty was territorial expansion, primarily into Muslim areas. This began during the reign of Yekuno Amlak himself, conquering the Sultanate of Shewa in 1285. The most significant expansions took place under Amda Seyon I, who conquered the Kingdom of Damot, the Hadiya Sultanate, Gojjam, Fatagar, the Sultanate of Dawaro, the Sultanate of Bale, and the Sultanate of Ifat. By the early 16th century, the empire's borders reached past Massawa in the north, past the Omo River in the south, to the Adal Sultanate in the east and near the confluence of the Didessa River and the Blue Nile in the west.

Although Adal was a tributary of Ethiopia, the sultanate invaded Ethiopia in 1531 with the support of the Ottoman Empire and other Muslim peoples in the region. The subsequent war continued until 1543 and it was only with the help of the Portuguese Empire and Cristóvão da Gama that Ethiopia was able to reclaim its lost territory and win the war. However, both the Christian and Muslim regions of Ethiopia were significantly weakened by the war; this has been suggested as a possible factor of the Oromo migrations of the 16th century. From political, religious and cultural perspectives, the mid-16th century signifies the shift from the Middle Ages to the early modern period.

== Government and society ==
Medieval Ethiopia is typically described as a feudal society relying on tenant farmers who constituted the peasant class, with landowners, nobility, and royalty above them in the social hierarchy. However, because of scarcity of information, knowledge on Ethiopian feudalism primarily comes from the Gondarine period.

Social stratification during the Gondarine period
Emperor (negusa nagast)
Nobility (makuannent)	Royal family (negusawi betasab); Hereditary nobility (masafent)			Clergy (kahenat)
Nobility (makuannent)	Local nobility (balabbat); Gentry (shum)	Traders	Merchants (naggade)	Clergy (kahenat)
Peasantry	Landowning peasants	Traders		
Peasantry	Tenant peasants	Traders		
Peasantry	Weavers, minstrels (azmari), etc.	Traders	Peddlers (shaqatch)	
Peasantry	Metalsmiths, potters, tanners, etc.			
Slaves

Some archaeological evidence and contemporary accounts have allowed for inferences of possible class structure in the Kingdom of Aksum. The kings of Aksum occupied the top of the social hierarchy, and a noble class below them is probable, based on size differences between larger palaces and smaller villas. A middle class may have consisted of merchants, independent farmers, and civil officials. Peasants likely included artisans in the urban centres, and farmers whose work supported Aksumite society. Slaves were the lowest social class; Greek traveller Cosmas Indicopleustes states that slaves in Aksum came primarily from the Sasu (in southern (Note: "...from Sasu (perhaps the gold-bearing Fazugli region some 200 km south- south-west of Lake Tsana, in modern Sudan) came gold...") Sudan (Note: Some academics, e.g. George Hatke, have discussed the proposition that "Sasu" is a scribal error for Kush.)) and Barbaria (Somalia) regions.

== Language ==
Geʽez was the common language used throughout the Aksumite period, initially written using the Ancient South Arabian script, but with the Geʽez script by the 1st century. The script began as a vowel-less abjad, developing into a vocalized abugida in the 4th century. However, Greek was used up until the decline of Aksum, appearing in stelae inscriptions, on Aksumite currency, and spoken as a lingua franca to facilitate trade with the Hellenized world. Geʽez remained in official written use through the entire Middle Ages (its counterpart in Islamic polities being Arabic), but likely declined as a spoken language in the post-Aksumite period. The exact period of this decline is uncertain, as essentially all written records continued to be written in Geʽez, but evidence of Tigrinya and Amharic appears in medieval texts. In addition, Cushitic and Omotic languages must have been spoken, and likely predate Semitic languages in the region. Geʽez has persisted to the modern day as a liturgical language. The Amhara nobles supported the Zagwe prince Lalibela in his power struggle against his brothers which led him to make Amharic "tongue of the king" (Ge'ez: ልሳነ ንጉሥ Lessana Negus) as well as fill the Amhara nobles in the top positions of his Kingdom. While the appellation of "language of the king" (Amharic: የንጉሥ ቋንቋ "Ye-Negus QwanQwa") and its use in the royal court are otherwise traced to the Amhara Emperor Yekuno Amlak.

== Religion ==
=== Pre-Christian era ===
Prior to the adoption of Christianity, the Kingdom of Aksum practised Semitic polytheism, which spread to the region from South Arabia. It has also been suggested that Judaism was present in the kingdom since ancient times; it is not known how widely the religion was practised, but its influence upon Ethiopian Christianity is significant.

=== Christian era ===
Christianity was introduced to the Kingdom of Aksum primarily by Frumentius, a 4th-century Phoenician missionary who was a slave to the king of Aksum. After preaching Christianity in the region, he was freed shortly before the king's death, though he stayed to teach Ezana of Aksum, who was the king's son and heir to the throne. He eventually converted Ezana to Christianity in the mid-4th century, which became the official religion of the Kingdom of Aksum shortly thereafter.

Having established itself as a Christian nation, Ethiopia expanded its borders and spread the religion to the surrounding peoples who practised traditional African religions, Judaism, and, later, Islam. The Aksumites enjoyed friendly relations with the Byzantine Empire for this reason, and although Ethiopia became secluded after the decline of Aksum, the kingdom participated in European religious and diplomatic affairs in the late Middle Ages. Wedem Arad sent an envoy to Spain in 1306 for the purpose of a religious alliance, Ethiopian monks participated in the Council of Constance in 1414–1418, an Ethiopian diaspora is documented in Rome as early as the 15th century, and there are several documented diplomatic missions from Ethiopia to Spain and Italy throughout the 15th century.

==== Islam ====
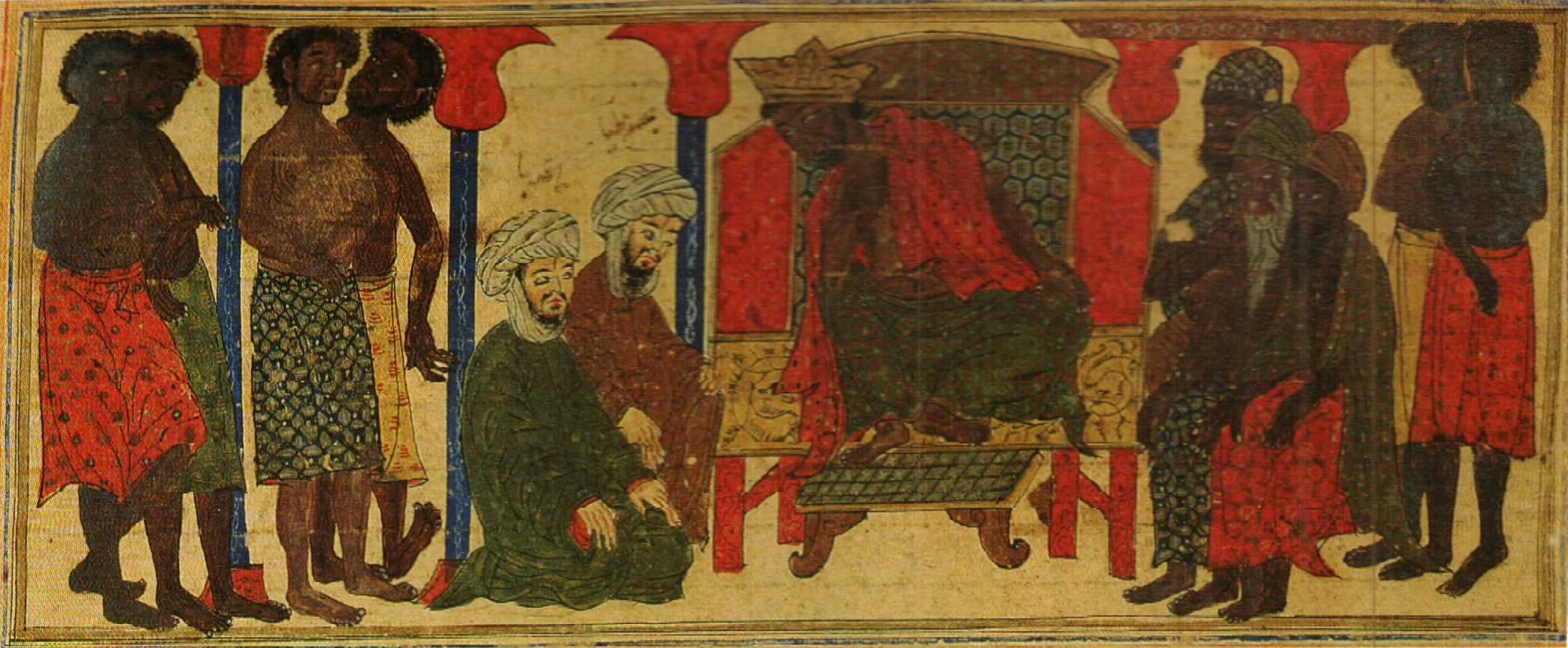
14th-century illustration depicting the king of Aksum refusing to turn over the Muslims to authorities from Mecca.

Despite officially being a Christian kingdom, Islam's history in Ethiopia is nearly as old as Islam itself. The first Muslims fled persecution in Arabia in 613 or 615, seeking refuge in the Kingdom of Aksum in an event known as the Migration to Abyssinia. The Dahlak Archipelago, now part of Eritrea, came under Muslim rule in the early 8th century; the Muslims there constituted the first permanent Muslim population in Ethiopia. By the 11th century, the area became the independent Sultanate of Dahlak.

There is evidence that the Shewa region had become Islamized and established a sultanate in the 12th century, and by the 13th century there was significant Muslim presence in what is now eastern Ethiopia. As part of the Solomonic dynasty's expansions, many Muslim states in the east were conquered or became subjects of Ethiopia. Tensions grew between Ethiopia and the Muslim states, eventually culminating in the Ethiopian–Adal war.

==== Judaism ====
The Beta Israel are an ethnoreligious group, most of whom now live in Israel, but originated in Semien. Their origins have been the subject of scholarly debate for decades. The Beta Israel oral tradition is that of an ancient Jewish ancestry, which is usually claimed from the Tribe of Dan. Genetic testing suggests that the group could have been founded by a small group of Jewish settlers in the region who converted the local population and intermarried among them over 2000 years ago. This hypothesis is further supported by the Beta Israel's non-observance of the Talmud, which would have been written after this ethnogenesis.

Written documents describing the Beta Israel date back to the 14th century. Under the reign of Yeshaq I, the Beta Israel were defeated in a war; he subsequently revoked their land ownership rights (known as rist) unless they converted to Christianity. Upon losing their land, they became known as Falasha ("landless, wandering"), which is a term that became used interchangeably with Beta Israel, but is now considered derogatory.

==== Local religions ====
Most of Ethiopian historiography focuses on Christian and Muslim history. However, although the vast majority of Ethiopians adhere to those religions today, there were significant communities which practiced traditional religions during the Middle Ages. Remnants of these cultures can be seen today in funerary stelae and tumuli, which are widespread in Ethiopia.

== Economy and technology ==
=== Geography ===
The Ethiopian Highlands and the Great Rift Valley resulted in medieval Ethiopia having a varied climate. Generally and like today, it can be divided into the highlands, lowlands and tropical regions. These climate zones dictated the agricultural practices in each region. Cereals and legumes, such as teff, millet, sorghum, barley, wheat, lentils, and chickpeas were grown in the cooler highlands. Pastoralism was prevalent in the hot, arid lowlands; and fruiting plants, such as coffea (coffee) and false banana were grown in the wetter tropical regions.

=== Economy ===
Although Ethiopia had been an agricultural civilization since the 6th millennium BC, it relied heavily on agriculture and became a rural economy after its decline as a significant trading power. Trade was primarily conducted on a small scale, though large market towns existed as well, serving as stops for caravans. Maritime trade continued through the Middle Ages, however this was no longer in the hands of the Ethiopian kingdom, but instead controlled by Muslim merchants. Beginning in the 8th century, a trade route to the Dahlak Archipelago was Ethiopia's link to the Red Sea, but a route between Shewa and Zeila came to prominence in the late 13th century.

While agriculture was the backbone of the Ethiopian economy, the kingdom exported some luxury goods, namely gold, ivory, and civet musk. A significant number of slaves (including many eunuchs) also came from Ethiopia and were sold in Arabia.

== Warfare ==
=== Armies ===
Medieval Ethiopia was a highly militaristic nation based on a system of ethnic regiments known as ṣewa in Geʽez. This practice can be traced back to the beginning of the Aksumite period, when the men of newly subjugated tribes were forced to become soldiers for the king of Aksum, commanded by a tributary who was likely a local chief. The regiments were given a plot of land called a gult in exchange for their military service. Merid Wolde Aregay suggests, based on Christopher Ehret's linguistic theories, that the origin of Aksumite rule itself may have been through the subjugation of Agaw agriculturalists by Geʽez-speaking pastoralists. These regiments were instrumental in maintaining Aksumite sovereignty over the trade routes within its empire; however, due to the decentralized nature of the regiments, chiefs could easily rebel against the king. The regimental system continued through the Middle Ages, but by the Zagwe era they consisted of professional soldiers. In the Solomonic era, during the reign of Zara Yaqob, this professionalism was reflected in the Amharic term č̣äwa, as ṣewa carried a connotation of slavery which was no longer accurate.

The sword and spear were universal in Ethiopia amongst both the infantry and cavalry. The javelin and shotel were used in Ifat. Soldiers of the cavalry were often equipped with chain mail and helmets, though some used a form of cloth armour. The bow and arrow were widespread, and arrow poison was occasionally used. Ethiopia's first experience with firearms was the Ethiopian–Adal War, which saw guns used on both sides.

=== Navies ===
Information regarding the Aksumite navy is limited, though it must have been crucial to the kingdom as it relied on maritime trade. The Monumentum Adulitanum, an ancient Aksumite inscription, mentions the worship of the sea god Beher, who is identified with Poseidon. The 6th-century Byzantine historian Procopius describes the Aksumite fleet as consisting of sewn boats, similar to the dhow still in use today. Throughout the Middle Ages, Ethiopia's administration and expansion was primarily focused on inland areas, though the northern coastal regions such as the Sultanate of Dahlak which controlled the Red Sea coast of modern-day Eritrea, were subject to Ethiopia for centuries.

== Arts ==
=== Art ===
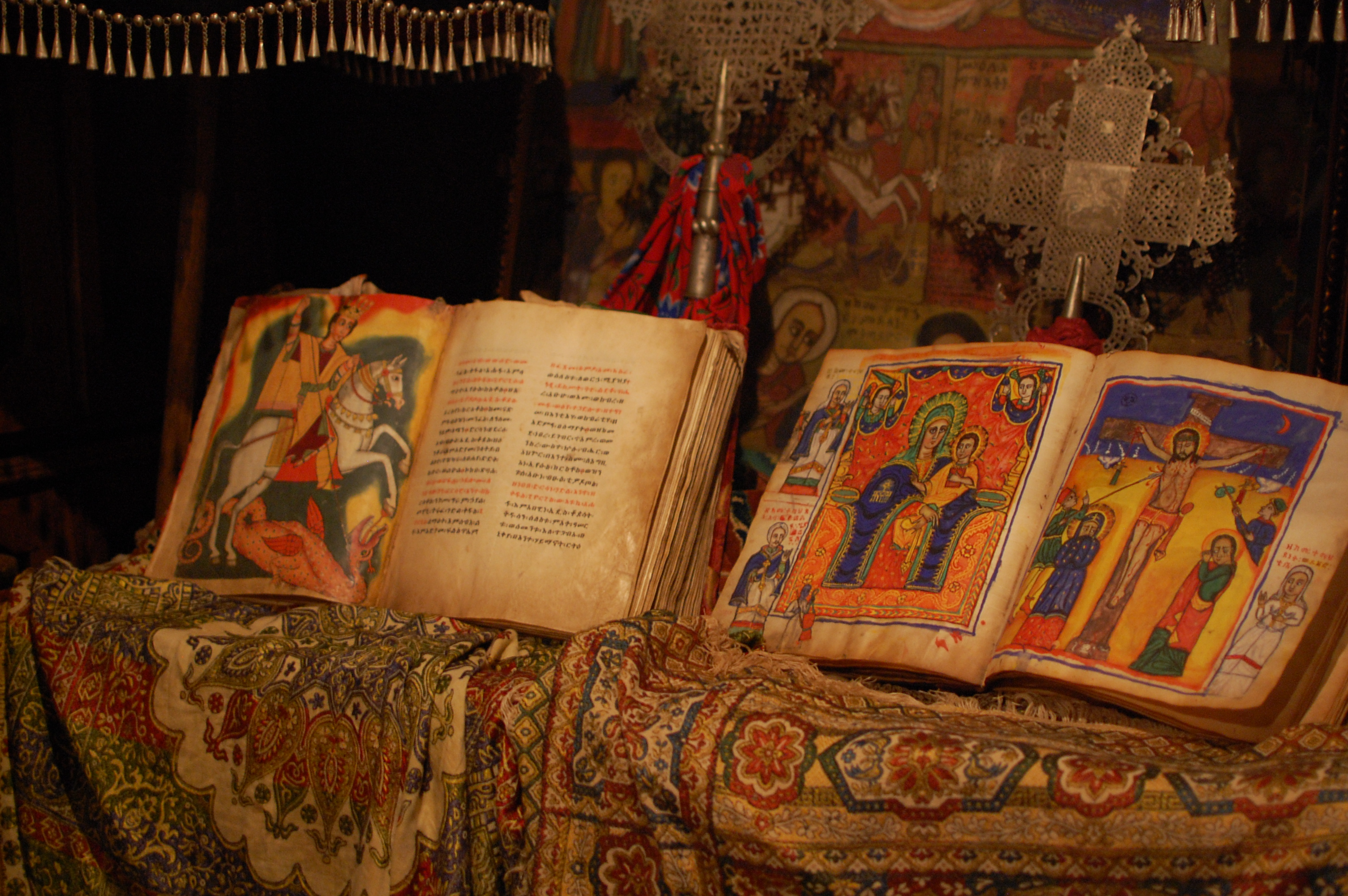
Illuminated manuscripts in the 16th-century Ura Kidane Mehret church.

The most considerable body of visual artworks from medieval Ethiopia is that of illuminated manuscripts. They bear some similarity to Coptic and Byzantine illuminated manuscripts, though they retain early Christian iconographic practices originating in Palestine which are absent elsewhere after the Byzantine Iconoclasm in the 8th century. However, study of Ethiopian manuscripts has thus far been limited. There are some surviving examples of church murals, though many are in poor condition and as such have not been the subject of significant research.

=== Literature ===
Medieval Ethiopian literature primarily consists of religious texts, particularly hagiographies. Although original Ethiopian additions were made to texts, early Ethiopian literature mostly comprised translations, generally from Greek under the Aksumites, and later Arabic. The first indigenous Ethiopian hagiographies appear in the 14th century.

Another prominent Ethiopian literary genre is that of the royal chronicle, which dates back to the reign of Amda Seyon I. These documents recounted the rules of the kings, including their administration of the kingdom and their military campaigns. They were used to legitimize the Solomonic dynasty, similarly to the Kebra Nagast, which is probably the best-known piece of Ethiopian literature.

=== Music and poetry ===
Music in Ethiopia is divided between secular (zafan) and sacred (zema). While secular music varied between locations and ethnic groups, zema generally remained consistent. Ethiopian tradition dates the origins of zema to the 6th century, crediting Yared with the composition of the liturgical hymns as well as an indigenous system of musical notation called meleket. However, zema is part of Beta Israel culture, while the attribution to Yared and the notation system are not. A 16th-century royal chronicle credits two clerics with the system; this, coupled with the differences between Christian and Jewish traditions, suggest that Yared was not responsible for these creations.

Also attributed to Yared is the traditional form of Amhara poetry known as qene. Qene utilizes a literary device known as sem-ena-werq ("wax and gold"), in which the "wax" is the face value of a message and the "gold" is the deeper meaning hidden underneath. The device is reflective of the Miaphysite beliefs of the Ethiopian Orthodox Tewahedo Church, with the wax representing the human nature of Jesus and the gold representing the divine. There is evidence of qene from at least as early as the 15th century.

=== Architecture ===
Buildings constructed in the Kingdom of Aksum have been subject to more research than those of the Middle Ages, leading to the identification of a discernible Aksumite architectural style. Art historian Claire Bosc-Tiessé defines the general characteristics as "...walls made by the alternation of horizontal wooden beams with layers of small stones joined with mortar, the whole surface being sometimes coated, and transverse rounded beams at regular intervals on the facade..." exemplified by buildings such as Debre Damo. Due to insufficient written records, medieval Ethiopian architecture is more difficult to date than Aksumite. As such, historians use the presence and development of Aksumite architectural characteristics to establish time periods for the construction of medieval buildings. Rock-hewn churches, particularly those at Lalibela, are a noteworthy example of post-Aksumite architecture.

== See also ==
- History of Ethiopia
- History of Africa

== Bibliography ==
- Aregay, Merid W. (June 1997). "Military Elites in Medieval Ethiopia". Journal of Ethiopian Studies. 30 (1): 31–73. JSTOR 41966063.
- Ayenachew, Deresse (2014). "Evolution and Organisation of the Ç̌äwa Military Regiments in Medieval Ethiopia" (PDF). Annales d'Ethiopie. 29 (29): 83–95. doi:10.3406/ethio.2014.1559.
- Ayenachew, Deresse (2020). "Territorial Expansion and Administrative Evolution under the 'Solomonic' Dynasty". In Kelly, Samantha (ed.). A Companion to Medieval Ethiopia and Eritrea. Leiden: Brill. ISBN 978-90-04-41958-2.
- Bausi, Alessandro (2020). "Ethiopia and the Christian Ecumene: Cultural Transmission, Translation, and Reception". In Kelly, Samantha (ed.). A Companion to Medieval Ethiopia and Eritrea. Leiden: Brill. ISBN 978-90-04-41958-2.
- Begley, Sharon (6 August 2012). "Genetic study offers clues to history of North Africa's Jews". Reuters.
- Bosc-Tiessé, Claire (2020). "Christian Visual Culture in Medieval Ethiopia: Overview, Trends and Issues". In Kelly, Samantha (ed.). A Companion to Medieval Ethiopia and Eritrea. Leiden: Brill. ISBN 978-90-04-41958-2.
- Brita, Antonella (2020). "Genres of Ethiopian-Eritrean Christian Literature with a Focus on Hagiography". In Kelly, Samantha (ed.). A Companion to Medieval Ethiopia and Eritrea. Leiden: Brill. ISBN 978-90-04-41958-2.
- Chekroun, Amélie; Hirsch, Bertrand (2020). "The Sultanates of Medieval Ethiopia". In Kelly, Samantha (ed.). A Companion to Medieval Ethiopia and Eritrea. Leiden: Brill. ISBN 978-90-04-41958-2.
- Chekroun, Amélie; Hirsch, Bertrand (2020). "The Muslim-Christian Wars and the Oromo Expansion: Transformations at the End of the Middle Ages (ca. 1500–ca. 1560)". In Kelly, Samantha (ed.). A Companion to Medieval Ethiopia and Eritrea. Leiden: Brill. ISBN 978-90-04-41958-2.
- Crummey, Donald (November 1980). "Abyssinian Feudalism". Past & Present (89): 115–138. doi:10.1093/past/89.1.115. JSTOR 650660.
- Derat, Marie-Laure (2020). "Before the Solomonids: Crisis, Renaissance and the Emergence of the Zagwe Dynasty (Seventh–Thirteenth Centuries)". In Kelly, Samantha (ed.). A Companion to Medieval Ethiopia and Eritrea. Leiden: Brill. ISBN 978-90-04-41958-2.
- Egziabher, Tewolde Berhan Gebre; Egziabher, Yoseph Gebre; Edwards, Sue (1993). "The impact of modern science and technology on human rights in Ethiopia". In Weeramantry, C. G. (ed.). The impact of technology on human rights: global case-studies. Tokyo: United Nations University Press. ISBN 92-808-0821-4.
- Ehret, Christopher (1979). "On the Antiquity of Agriculture in Ethiopia". The Journal of African History. 20 (2): 161–177. doi:10.1017/S002185370001700X. JSTOR 181512. S2CID 162986221.
- Fauvelle, François-Xavier (2020). "Of Conversion and Conversation: Followers of Local Religions in Medieval Ethiopia". In Kelly, Samantha (ed.). A Companion to Medieval Ethiopia and Eritrea. Leiden: Brill. ISBN 978-90-04-41958-2.
- Fritsch, Emmanuel; Kidane, Habtemichael (2020). "The Medieval Ethiopian Orthodox Church and Its Liturgy". In Kelly, Samantha (ed.). A Companion to Medieval Ethiopia and Eritrea. Leiden: Brill. ISBN 978-90-04-41958-2.
- Girma, Mohammed (2010). "Whose Meaning? The Wax and Gold Tradition as a Philosophical Foundation for an Ethiopian Hermeneutic". Sophia. 50 (50): 175–187. doi:10.1007/s11841-010-0201-9. S2CID 154810755.
- Hatke, George (May 2011). "Warfare, Commerce, and Political Fictions in Ancient Northeast Africa". Ancient World Digital Library. NYU Press.
- Henze, Paul B. (2000). Layers of Time: A History of Ethiopia. Leiden: Brill. ISBN 978-1-137-11786-1.
- Hubbard, David Allan (1956). The literary sources of the Kebra Nagast (PhD). University of St Andrews. hdl:10023/544.
- Kelly, Samantha (2020). "Introduction". In Kelly, Samantha (ed.). A Companion to Medieval Ethiopia and Eritrea. Leiden: Brill. ISBN 978-90-04-41958-2.
- Kelly, Samantha (2020). "Medieval Ethiopian Diasporas". In Kelly, Samantha (ed.). A Companion to Medieval Ethiopia and Eritrea. Leiden: Brill. ISBN 978-90-04-41958-2.
- Levine, Donald Nathan (1965). "The Old and New Elites". Wax & Gold: Tradition and Innovation in Ethiopian Culture. Chicago: University of Chicago Press. LCCN 65018340.
- Lusini, Gianfrancesco (2020). "The Ancient and Medieval History of Eritrean and Ethiopian Monasticism: An Outline". In Kelly, Samantha (ed.). A Companion to Medieval Ethiopia and Eritrea. Leiden: Brill. ISBN 978-90-04-41958-2.
- Molvaer, R. K. (2012). "Ethiopia, Poetry of". The Princeton Encyclopedia of Poetry and Poetics. Princeton: Princeton University Press. ISBN 9780691154916.
- Munro-Hay, Stuart (1991). Aksum: An African Civilization of Late Antiquity. Edinburgh: Edinburgh University Press. ISBN 978-0748601066.
- Phillipson, David W. (2012). Foundations of an African Civilisation: Aksum & the Northern Horn, 1000 BC - AD 1300. Woodbridge: James Currey. ISBN 978-1-84701-041-4.
- Poissonnier, Bertrand (2012). "The Giant Stelae of Aksum in Light of the 1999 Excavations". Palethnology of Africa (4): 49–86.
- Salvadore, Matteo (December 2010). "The Ethiopian Age of Exploration: Prester John's Discovery of Europe, 1306-1458". Journal of World History. 21 (4): 593–627. doi:10.1353/jwh.2010.a413985. JSTOR 41060852.
- Selassie, Sergew Hable (January 1972). "The Problem of Gudit". Journal of Ethiopian Studies. 10 (1): 113–124. JSTOR 41965849.
- Shelemay, Kay Kaufman (1982). "Zēmā: A Concept of Sacred Music in Ethiopia". The World of Music. 24 (3): 52–67. JSTOR 43560851.
- Thompson, E. David (1976). "Languages of Northern Eritrea". In Bender, M. Lionel (ed.). The Non-Semitic Languages of Ethiopia. East Lansing: African Studies Center, Michigan State University. ASIN B00ARO5FDQ.
- Wion, Anaïs (2020). "Medieval Ethiopian Economies: Subsistence, Global Trade and the Administration of Wealth". In Kelly, Samantha (ed.). A Companion to Medieval Ethiopia and Eritrea. Leiden: Brill. ISBN 978-90-04-41958-2.
