= Masoba Warq =

Queen of Zagwe and Princess of Axum in the 10th century

Queen of Zagwe dynasty
- Reign: 960 – 970/1010
- Predecessor: Zagwe Dynasty established
- Successor: unknown
- Born: 10th century unknown, possibly Axum
- Died: 1010 (uncertain) unknown, possibly Lasta.
- Spouse: Mara Takla Haymanot
- Issue: Tatadim; Jan Seyum; Germa Seyum; Gempawedamo (uncertain); Terde'ana Gabaz (uncertain); Zena Petros (uncertain)
- Dynasty: Zagwe, Solomonic Dynasty
- Father: Dil Na'od
- Religion: Ethiopian Orthodox Church

Masoba Warq was a princess of the Kingdom of Axum, and the queen of the Zagwe Dynasty. She was the daughter of Dil Na'od of Axum and the Wife of Mara Takla Haymanot of the Zagwe Dynasty. She had multiple children with him, such as Tantawedem. But, according to the Dabra Libanos manuscript, it mentions 44 Kings of Shewa after the death and deposition of Dil Na'od and it mentions Masoba as a Queen Regent of Shewa. Though if it is true, she was actually married with Marah of Zagwe, and had children with him, it would be likely that the children would have Solomonic Dynastical Descent as Masoba is the daughter of Dil Na'od.
