= Harbai =

King of Ethiopia in 13th century

King of Ethiopia
- Reign: 13th-century
- Predecessor: Mairari
- Successor: n/a
- Dynasty: Zagwe dynasty

Harbai was a King (negus) of Ethiopia. The Paris Chronicle and a manuscript Pedro Páez and Manuel de Almeida saw at Axum, list him as the last of the Zagwe dynasty. He is considered the ancestor of the kings of the Ethiopian province of Lasta.

Little is known about his reign, which E.A. Wallis Budge states lasted 20 years. Budge wrote that Harbai died around 1330; other authorities date his death before 1270, when Yekuno Amlak became ruler. Huntingford assumes that this ruler is a dublet of Kedus Harbe, who is mentioned in the Gadl Lalibela, or the hagiography of king Gebre Mesqel Lalibela, as his brother.
