= Mara Takla Haymanot =

King and the founder of Zagwe dynasty in the 10th century

King of Zagwe dynasty
- Reign: 960–970
- Predecessor: Zagwe Dynasty Established
- Successor: Zena Petros
- Consort: Masoba Warq
- Issue: Tatadim; Jan Seyum; Germa Seyum; Gempawedamo (uncertain); Terde'ana Gabaz (uncertain); Zena Petros (uncertain)
Names
- Mararah; Takla Haymanot (referred by James Bruce)
- Dynasty: Zagwe, House of Gideon (unsure)
- Father: Gideon IV (unsure)
- Religion: Ethiopian Orthodox Church

Mara Takla Haymanot (Ge'ez: ማራ ታክላ ሃይማኖት) was King and the founder of the Zagwe dynasty. Some king lists give his name simply as "Mararah", and other King Lists as "Takla Haymanot".

== Regnal controversy ==
According to one tradition, Mara was born in the province of Lasta, which was his power base. Originally a general of Dil Na'od, whose daughter Masoba Warq became his wife, Mara overthrew his father-in-law to found the new dynasty. James Bruce, on the other hand, presents another tradition that Dil Na'od was overthrown by Gudit, and that Mara Takla Haymanot (whom Bruce calls "Takla Haymanot") was a cousin of Gudit who succeeded her after several of her own family.

There is some disagreement over the exact time when he came to the throne: there are two different traditions for how long the Zagwe dynasty ruled: the more common tradition states that it was for 333 years, while a less common one gives the time as 133 years. The Italian scholar Carlo Conti Rossini accepted the shorter period, and working back from the accepted date of 1270 for the end of the Zagwe dynasty, claims that this dynasty started around 1137. He supported this theory with the recorded exchange between Patriarch John V of Alexandria and an unnamed king of Ethiopia, who asked for a new abuna because the current one was too old; Conti Rossini argued that the actual reason was that the abuna refused to condone the coup which resulted in Mara Takla Haymanot gaining the throne.

The extent of his kingdom was much smaller than the later Solomonic dynasty came to rule, embracing parts of Lasta, Wag, Tigray, and perhaps northern Begemder.

=== Reign Length ===
Mara Takla Haymanot is often recorded on regnal lists as reigning for 13 years. However, one manuscript held in the British Museum claims he ruled for only 3 years, while another from Debre Libanos claims he ruled for 40 years.

== Family ==
According to a manuscript from Dabra Libanos, quoted by Carlo Conti Rossini, Mara Takla Haymanot had four children:

1. Jan Seyum (son)
2. Germa Seyum (son)
3. Gempawedamo (son)
4. Terde'ana Gabaz (daughter)

The same manuscript states that the next three rulers of Ethiopia after Mara Takla Haymanot were his three sons.

However, according to Taddesse Tamrat, Mara Takla Haymanot's oldest son was Tatadim, who is not named as a son in the above manuscript. A manuscript held in the British Museum names Tatadim, Jan Seyum and Germa Seyum as the next three rulers and does not name Gempawedamo. This line of succession is generally more accepted by historians as being the correct order of the Zagwe kings.

Regnal titles
Preceded by Dil Na'od as King of Axum	Emperor of Ethiopia	Succeeded by Tatadim
