= Yemrehana Krestos =

King of Zagwe dynasty in the 11th century

King of Zagwe dynasty
- Reign: 11th century – 12th century
- Predecessor: Germa Seyum
- Successor: Kedus Harbe
- Dynasty: Zagwe dynasty
- Religion: Ethiopian Orthodox Church

Yemrehana Krestos (Ge'ez: ይምረሃና ክርስቶስ, Yəmrəḥannä Krəstos, often referred to as "Yəmrəḥa" in the sources) was the third king of the Zagwe dynasty, ruling during the second half of the twelfth century. His biography is recorded in the Gädlä Yəmrəḥannä Krəstos. He was first Zagwe king to be recognised as a saint in the Ethiopian Church calendar, and is commemorated on the 19th of Ṭəqəmt(i) (ጥቅምት) (or 29th October).

== Reign ==
According to Taddesse Tamrat, he was the son of Germa Seyum, the brother of Tatadim; however the Italian scholar Carlo Conti Rossini published in 1902 a document that stated Yemrehana Krestos was the successor of Na'akueto La'ab, and succeeded by Yetbarak. According to a manuscript Pedro Páez and Manuel de Almeida saw at Axum, he ruled for 40 years.

A council presided over by Yemrehana Krestos condemned Syrian and Egyptian monks who taught that the body of Jesus Christ was not of the same nature as most human beings, and as a result they were persecuted and driven out of the places in which they were living.

== Accomplishments ==
Yemrehana Krestos constructed a lavish stone church in the Aksumite style, ornamented with objects from Egypt. Located 12 miles northeast from Lalibela, the Yemrehana Krestos Church was built in a large northeast-facing cave on the western side of Mount Abuna Yosef. Until the construction of a road in 2000, this church was reachable only after "a long day's arduous journey on foot or mule".

== Reputation ==
Some believe that he is the Ethiopian king who inspired the myth of Prester John. Taddesse Tamrat describes him as the king of Ethiopia closest to a priest, noting that he insisted on ruling Ethiopia according to Apostolic canons. Stuart Munro-Hay speculates that "Abu Salih's description of the kings of Abyssinia as priests might have been based on information about this ruler that had reached Egypt.

Francisco Alvarez stated that Yemrehana Krestos began the tradition of confining rival heirs to the Imperial throne at Amba Geshen, although this is disputed.

== Bibliography ==
- Marie-Laure Derat, "King and priest and Prester John: analysis of the Life of a 12th century Ethiopian king, Yemrehanna Krestos", Annales d'Ethiopie, 27 (2012), pp. 323–326 doi:10.3406/ethio.2012.1474
- Sellassie, Sergew Hable (1972). Ancient and Medieval Ethiopian History to 1270. Addis Ababa.

Regnal titles
Preceded by Germa Seyum	Emperor of Ethiopia	Succeeded by Kedus Harbe
