= Lalibela (disambiguation) =

Lalibela may refer to:

- Lalibela, Emperor of Ethiopia in the 12th century
- Lalibela, a place in Amhara Region, Ethiopia
- "Lalibela", a song by Canadian electronic musician Caribou (musician)
- Lalibela (yacht), luxury yacht, destroyed by fire, 2018-10-13
