= Krestos =

Krestos is a surname. Notable people with the surname include:

- Gebre Krestos, Emperor of Ethiopia
- Negasi Krestos, Ruler of Shewa
- Newaya Krestos, Emperor of Ethiopia
- Yemrehana Krestos, Emperor of Ethiopia

== See also ==
- Yemrehana Krestos Church, Orthodox church located in Amhara Region, northern Ethiopia
