= Mount Abuna Yosef =

Mountain in the Ethiopian Highlands

Abuna Yosef
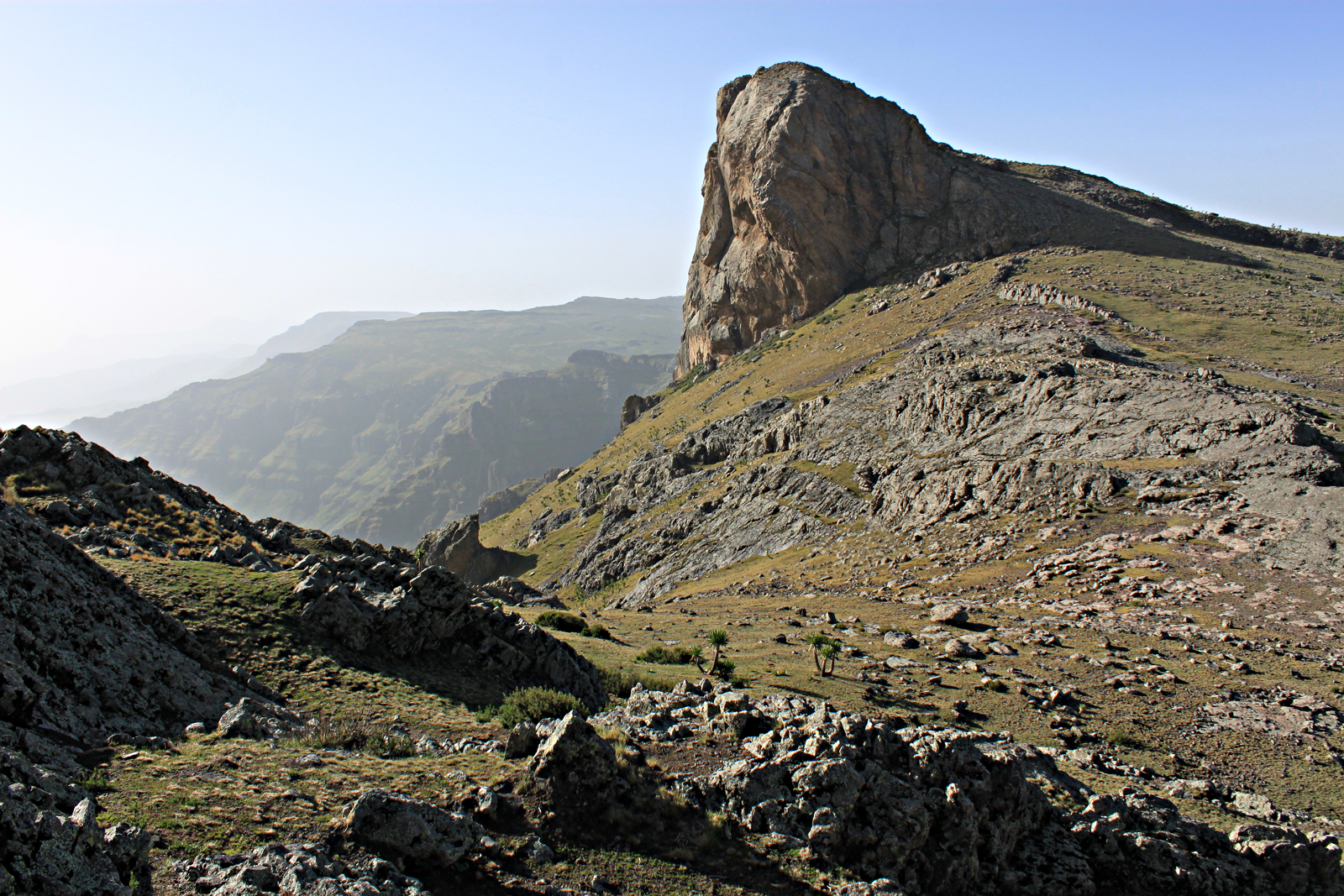
- Abuna Yosef peak

Highest point
- Elevation: 4,260 m (13,980 ft)
- Prominence: 1,909 m (6,263 ft)
- Listing: Ultra
- Coordinates: 12°08′27″N 39°10′54″E

Geography
- Location within Ethiopia
- Location: Semien Wollo Zone, Ethiopia
- Parent range: Ethiopian Highlands

Climbing
- Easiest route: Access through Wendatch (3500 m)

Abuna Yosef (Amharic: አቡነ ዮሴፍ) is a prominent mountain in the Lasta massif of the Ethiopian Highlands. At 4,260 metres (13,976 ft) it is the 6th tallest mountain in Ethiopia and the 19th highest of Africa. It is located in the Semien Wollo Zone of the Amhara Region.

== Afro-alpine environment ==
The Abuna Yosef massif is home to Ethiopian wolves, Gelada baboons, Erica arborea, Lobelia and other afro-alpine vegetation.

The Abuna Yosef Community Conservation Area covers about 70 km^{2} of the Abuna Yosef massif.

== Major towns ==
At the eastern part of the mountain range, the town of Wandatch (on the Kobo - Lalibela road) is the main entry point to the Abuna Yosef afro-alpine massif. At 3500 m above sea level, it is one of the most elevated towns in Ethiopia.

The towns of Muja, Kulmesq and Lalibela are located on the footslopes of the massif.

== Monolithic churches on the footslopes ==
A notable landmark on this mountain is the Church of Gennete Maryam, a monolithic church which tradition reports was excavated during the reign of Yekuno Amlak. Also notable are four free-standing churches build inside caves in the mountain, the oldest and most famous being Yemrehana Krestos Church, built by the Zagwe king of the same name. The other three are Emakina Medhane Alem (probably built by Yekuno Amlak in the late 13th century), Lideta Maryam, and Zammadu Maryam (probably 15th century). The churches of Lalibela lie in its foothills.

== Climate ==
Due to the mountain being having the 6th highest elevation in the country it makes it one of the coldest locations and in winter months temperatures nightfall temperatures are typically below freezing. However, due to the dry season also being during the months where temperature fall below freezing this causes a lack of snow on the mountain even though it occurs multiple times yearly.

Climate data for Abuna Yosef
Month	Jan	Feb	Mar	Apr	May	Jun	Jul	Aug	Sep	Oct	Nov	Dec	Year
Mean daily maximum °C (°F)	−0.4 (31.2)	−0.1 (31.9)	2.3 (36.2)	4.4 (39.9)	6.6 (43.8)	9.1 (48.4)	9.8 (49.7)	9.4 (48.9)	7.1 (44.8)	5.9 (42.7)	3.7 (38.6)	1.1 (33.9)	4.9 (40.8)
Mean daily minimum °C (°F)	−2.3 (27.8)	−2.0 (28.4)	−1.0 (30.2)	0.9 (33.7)	2.9 (37.3)	5.2 (41.3)	6.6 (43.9)	6.4 (43.5)	4.4 (39.9)	2.2 (35.9)	−0.1 (31.8)	−1.4 (29.5)	1.8 (35.3)
Source: Climate Data

== See also ==
- List of Ultras of Africa (ultra prominent peaks)
