= Germa Seyum =

King of Zagwe dynasty in the 11th century

King of Zagwe dynasty
- Reign: 11th century
- Predecessor: Jan Seyum
- Successor: Yemrehana Krestos
- Dynasty: Zagwe dynasty
- Father: Mara Takla Haymanot
- Mother: Masoba Warq
- Religion: Ethiopian Orthodox Church

Germa Seyum (Ge'ez: ገርማ ስዩም) was King of Zagwe dynasty. He is known as Be'mnet on some regnal lists.

== Background ==
Taddesse Tamrat states that he was a son of Mara Takla Haymanot, the younger brother of King Tatadim, and the father of Pentewudem, Kedus Harbe and Gebre Mesqel Lalibela.

Germa Seyum is not named on shorter lists of Zagwe kings, but appears on longer lists, usually as the successor of Jan Seyum. One version of the list contains 11 names and lists Germa Seyum as the fourth king, between Jan Seyum and Yemrehana Krestos, with 40 years of rule. Another version of the list instead lists his successor as "Gempawedemo" (possibly Tatadim).

The longest lists of Zagwe kings contain sixteen names and place Germa Seyum in eleventh place in the line of succession. On this list he is stated to have reigned for 20 years.

The exact dates of his reign are difficult to know because of the variation in reign lengths and order on different king lists. Working backwards from 1270, when the Zagwe dynasty was deposed, Germa Seyum would have reigned c. 981–1021, c. 999–1039, c. 1001–1041 or c. 1033–1053 depending on the regnal list.

== Bibliography ==
- Basset, René (1882). Études sur l'histoire d'Éthiopie. Paris.
- Budge, E. A. (1928). A History of Ethiopia: Nubia and Abyssinia (Volume I). London: Methuen & Co.
- Rüppell, Eduard (1840). Reise in Abyssinien: Zweiter Band. Frankfurt.
- Selassie, Sergew Hable (1972). Ancient and Medieval Ethiopian History to 1270. Addis Ababa.
- Tamrat, Taddesse (1972). Church and State in Ethiopia. Oxford: Clarendon Press.

Regnal titles
Preceded by Jan Seyum	Emperor of Ethiopia	Succeeded by Yemrehana Krestos
