= Kedus Harbe =

King of Zagwe dynasty in the 12th century

King of Zagwe dynasty
- Reign: Mid 12th century-1181
- Predecessor: Yemrehana Krestos
- Successor: Gebre Mesqel Lalibela
- Dynasty: Zagwe dynasty
- Father: Jan Seyum
- Religion: Ethiopian Orthodox Church

Kedus Harbe (Ge'ez: ቅዱስ ሓርበኛ, "Holy Warrior") was King of Zagwe dynasty. According to Taddesse Tamrat, he was the son of Jan Seyum, the brother of Tatadim. Some authorities date his reign to the years 1079–1119. G.W.B. Huntingford does not include him in his list of kings of the Zagwe dynasty. On some regnal lists he is known as Gabra Maryam.

== Reign ==
According to Richard Pankhurst, Kedus Harbe tried to break the hold of Egyptian Coptic influence on the Ethiopian Church by increasing the number of bishops ordained in his country to seven. However the prelate, Abba Mikael, refused, stating that this could only be done by the Patriarch of Alexandria, so the king sent letters to the Patriarch and the Muslim ruler of Egypt. The ruler was first sympathetic to the request, but the prelate warned him that with that many bishops they could appoint their own Archbishop and be free to develop "enmity and hostility" towards their Muslim neighbors. When the messengers returned with Kedus Harbe's answer, the country had experienced great famine and pestilence. "These were the first such calamities for which the historical mention exists."

== Succession ==
Sergew Hable Selassie noted this king does not appear on the "short" list of Zagwe kings, but does appear on the longer lists. On one variation of the "long" list he reigned between Yemrehana Krestos and Lalibela and ruled for 40 years. However, another version moved Yemrehana Krestos further down the succession order and as a result Kedus Harbe is placed after Germa Seyum. The "longer" Zagwe king list contains sixteen names and states he reigned for 40 years after Yemrehana Kristos.

Dating the individual reign dates of Zagwe kings is difficult due to the various different succession orders and reign lengths recorded on different lists. Working backwards from the year 1270, when the Zagwe dynasty was deposed, the so-called "longer" king list would date Kedus Harbe's reign to c. 1093–1133. If versions of the "long" list with recorded reign lengths are used instead, then Kedus Harbe's reign could date to either c. 1061–1101, c. 1079–1119 or c. 1141–1181. The 1922 regnal list dated his reign to 1093–1133 on the Ethiopian calendar, which is 7 or 8 years behind the Gregorian calendar.

== Bibliography ==
- Basset, René (1882). Études sur l'histoire d'Éthiopie. Paris.
- Budge, E. A. (1928a). A History of Ethiopia: Nubia and Abyssinia (Volume I). London: Methuen & Co.
- Rey, C. F. (1927). In the Country of the Blue Nile. London: Camelot Press.
- Rüppell, Eduard (1840). Reise in Abyssinien: Zweiter Band. Frankfurt.
- Selassie, Sergew Hable (1972). Ancient and Medieval Ethiopian History to 1270. Addis Ababa.

Regnal titles
Preceded by Yemrehana Krestos	Emperor of Ethiopia	Succeeded by Gebre Mesqel Lalibela
