= Yetbarak =

King of Zagwe dynasty in the 13th century

King of Zagwe dynasty
- Reign: 1261–1270
- Predecessor: Na'akueto La'ab
- Successor: Position abolished by Yekuno Amlak
- Dynasty: Zagwe dynasty
- Father: Gebre Mesqel Lalibela
- Mother: Meskel Kibra
- Religion: Ethiopian Orthodox Church

Yetbarak (Ge’ez: ይትባረክ) was a King of the Zagwe dynasty. According to Taddesse Tamrat, he was the son of Lalibela.

== History ==
Tradition states that Yetbarak ascended to the throne after his father King Lalibela had taken the crown away from his first choice of successor, Yetbarak's cousin, Na'akueto La'ab. Taddesse Tamrat argues that this tradition is based on an official version of events, and theorizes that Na'akueto La'ab had fought with Yetbarak for the throne, and despite initial success, Yetbarak became king in the end.

He also suggests that Yetbarak was the same individual known in the "official hagiographical tradition" as Za-Ilmaknun, the king of the Zagwe dynasty whom Yekuno Amlak killed and succeeded after the Battle of Ansata. He notes that Za-Ilmaknun is translated as "The Unknown, the hidden one", an "esoteric term" that has "become a useful escape mechanism in denying that the king killed by Yekuno Amlak had anything to do with Lasta."

Regnal titles
Preceded by Na'akueto La'ab	Emperor of Ethiopia	Succeeded by Yekuno Amlak
