= Na'akueto La'ab =

King of Zagwe dynasty in the 13th century

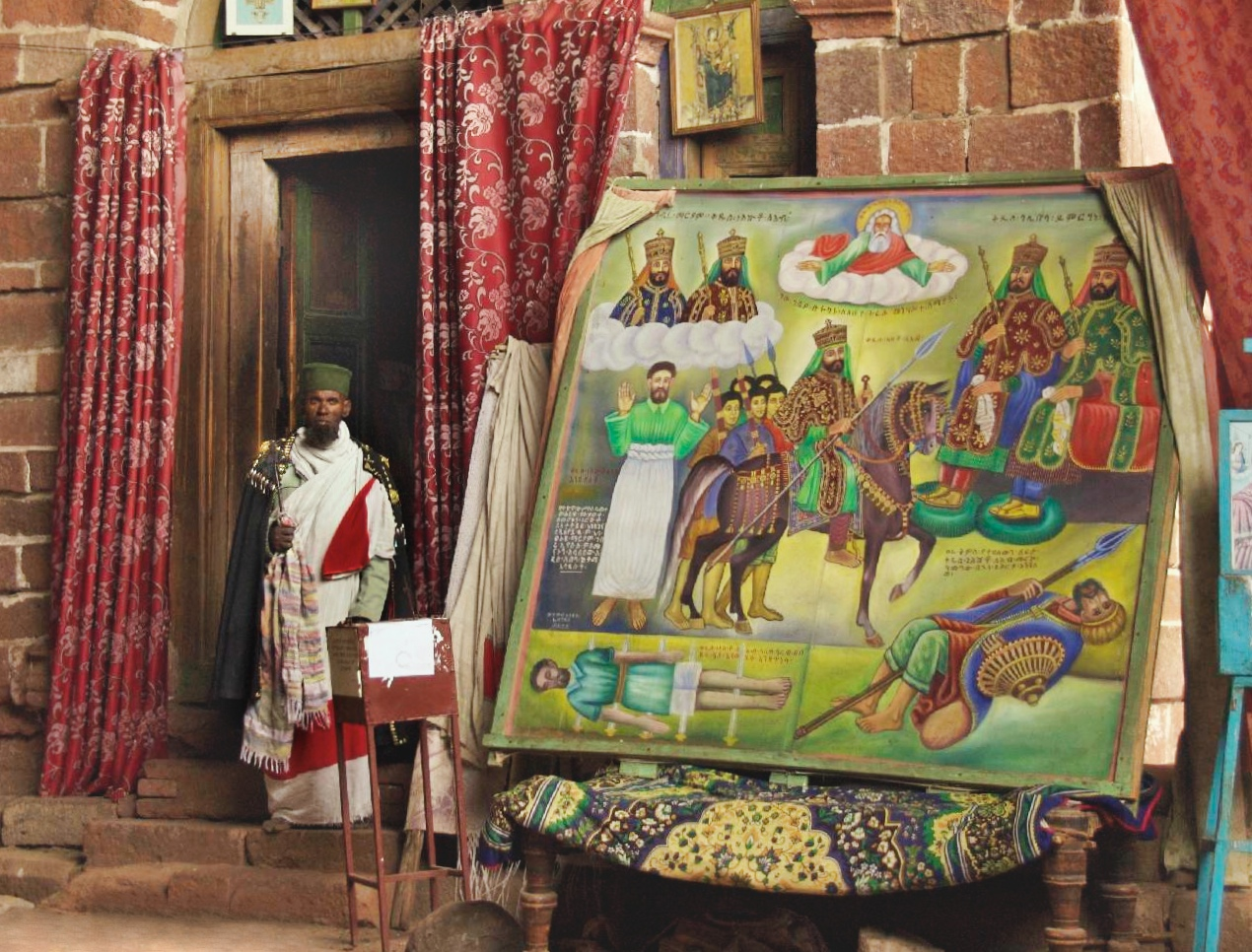
- Priest with large canvas at the monastery of Na'akueto La'ab, with a depiction of the legend of kings

King of Zagwe dynasty
- Reign: 1221–1261
- Predecessor: Gebre Maskel Lalibela
- Successor: Yetbarak
- Dynasty: Zagwe dynasty
- Father: Kedus Harbe
- Religion: Ethiopian Orthodox Church

Na'akueto La'ab (Ge'ez: ንዓኩቶ ላዓብ) was the King of Zagwe dynasty. According to Taddesse Tamrat, he was the son of Kedus Harbe. Richard Pankhurst credits him with the creation of the church located in a cave a half-day's journey from the town of Lalibela. According to a manuscript Pedro Páez and Manuel de Almeida saw at Axum, Na'akueto La'ab ruled for 40 years, a suspiciously round number.

== Reign ==
A Gadla or hagiography of Na'akueto La'ab exists, in a manuscript written in the 17th century. According to Huntingford, it documents that Zagwe power had extended into Gojjam, and credits the king with building two churches: one at Sewa'a "which is said to have been called Wagra Sehin ('mountain of incense') 'among Celestrial', and Ashetan or Asheten 'among Terrestrials'", which Huntingford identifies with an existing church named Ashetan Maryam, a monolithic structure located a few kilometers east of Lalibela; the other in the land of Qoqhena, which was given a tabot from a desecrated church dedicated to Istifanos.

Tradition states that queen Masqal Kibra convinced her husband, King Lalibela, to abdicate in favor of Na'akueto La'ab, but 18 months later when the young king's soldiers appropriated a poor farmer's only cow for the king's dinner table, she convinced Lalibela to resume the throne. Taddesse Tamrat suspects that the end of Lalibela's rule was not in truth this peaceful. He argues that this tradition masks a brief period when Na'akueto La'ab "was no doubt a rallying point for disaffected elements in the country, and although kept under close watch managed to usurp the throne for a brief period until Yetbarak managed to take his father's throne."

Regnal titles
Preceded by Gebre Mesqel Lalibela	Emperor of Ethiopia	Succeeded by Yetbarak
