= Institute of Ethiopian Studies =

Academic institute for Ethiopian civilization

The Institute of Ethiopian Studies (IES) was officially established in 1963 to collect information on Ethiopian civilization, its history, cultures, and languages. The Institute includes a research and publication unit, a library, and a museum. It is located at Addis Ababa University, Sidist (6) Kilo campus, which was at the time of the IES's opening, named Haile Selassie I University after the last emperor of Abyssinia.

The current director of the Institute is Dr. Ahmed Hassen, an associate professor at the university.

== History of the IES ==
The first director of the Institute was Richard Pankhurst (son of suffragette Sylvia Pankhurst), and the first librarian was Stanislaw Chojnacki. Other directors were Fäqadu Gadamu, Taddesse Tamrat, Taddese Beyene, Bahru Zewde, Abdussamad Ahmad, Baye Yemam, and Elizabet Walde Giyorgis.

== History of the building ==
The Institute is housed in what was formerly the Gännäta Le’ul or Princely Paradise Palace, which was constructed in 1934 as the principle palace building for Emperor Haile Selassie and his family. In 1936 when Italian forces occupied the city of Addis Ababa, the Fascist Viceroy, Rodolfo Graziani, made it his home and administrative center. The palace became the center of international attention when two Eritrean nationalists attempted to assassinate the viceroy, and Graziani responded by massacring the population of Addis Ababa (remembered as Yekatit 12).

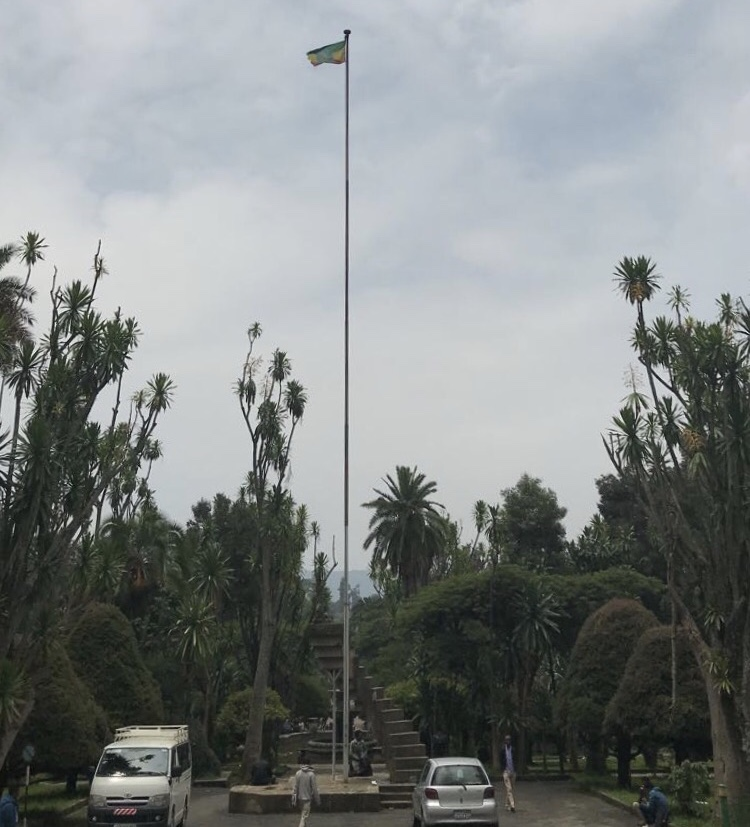
Behind the flag is the spiral staircase was built during the Italian occupation. Each step marked a year of Mussolini's rule. It was meant to symbolize Fascist domination. Upon restoration of Haile Selassie to the throne, the Lion of Judah statue was placed atop the staircase.

Upon Italian liberation, Selassie was restored to the throne, and in 1950, the palace became the (unofficial) headquarters of the Empire.

The palace was also the site of the abortive coup d'etat of 1960, and though it failed, it marked the beginning of the Ethiopian student movement, which would publicly demonstrate against the government for political, economic, and social change.

The ground floor of the palace was originally a banquet hall, which is now the site of the library. The second floor held the Emperor's bedrooms and study, which is now a part of the Ethnological Museum.

== Research and publication unit ==
This IES unit conducts and publishes research. It publishes conference proceedings, museum catalogues, reference works, and the Journal of Ethiopian Studies (JES), which was founded in 1963. The journal publishes articles in English and Amharic, with editorial support from the Hiob Ludolf Centre for Ethiopian Studies at Hamburg University. It published the national bibliography of materials published in and about Ethiopia until 1975, when the National Archives and Library of Ethiopia took over this responsibility.

This unit puts on the international Ethiopian Studies conference once every nine years. There is also a monthly seminar held locally at the IES, for researchers to present their findings to each other and university staff and students.

== Ethnological museum ==
This IES unit is the first university museum in Ethiopia. The museum has a permanent collection in five fields of study: anthropology, art, ethnomusicology, numismatics (the study of coinage), and philately (the study of postage stamps). Its hosts temporary exhibitions. It has objects dating back to the early Aksumite period. When the museum opened, it included a zoology species collection, but that is now housed at the Natural History Museum of Ethiopia at Arat (4) Kilo campus. Being the former site of the palace, the museum displays the Emperor Haile Selassie's chambers and his embroidered robes and military uniform. The Society of Friends of the IES was established in 1968 to raise financial support for the museum.

== Library ==
The IES Library collects in the field of Ethiopian Studies (in the humanities and social sciences) and also preserves Ethiopian manuscripts. Its Woldämäskäl Memorial Research Center holds most of the Institute's rare publications and manuscripts in Ge’ez, Amharic, Tigrinya, Oromiffa, and other Ethiopian languages. The library has a manuscript restoration laboratory which works on conserving texts that date back to the fifteenth century. It is a non-lending library. It holds all university students’ theses and dissertations related to Ethiopian Studies. It contains six departments: the Foreign Languages Department, Ethiopian Languages and Periodicals, Manuscripts and Archives, the Woldämäskäl Memorial Research Center, Audiovisual Materials, and Automation and Digitization.
