= Battle of Ansata =

1270 battle of the Zagwe and Solomonic dynasties in medieval Ethiopia

Date	1270
Location	Gayint, Ethiopia, north of Bashilo River
Result	Amhara victory

Belligerents
Amhara rebels Makhzumi Dynasty	Zagwe dynasty

Commanders and leaders
Yekuno Amlak; Mālēzāy	Yetbarak †

Strength
Unknown Amhara soldiers Unknown Gafat regiments	Unknown Agew soldiers

The Battle of Ansata was fought in the year 1270 AD between the forces of Yekuno Amlak, future emperor of Ethiopia, and Yetbarak of the Zagwe dynasty.

== Battle ==
The forces of Yekuno Amlak had received assistance from the Gafat, from six regiments commanded by Mālēzāy, a Christian supporter of his claim, and from Sultan Dil Gamis of the Sultanate of Shewa, giving the Amhara rebels an advantage over the Zagwe. Merid Wolde Aregay suggests that the name Mäläzay is associated with the Mäläsay, the term by which the elite warriors of Adal and Harar were later designated. After defeating his army, Yekuno Amlak pursued Yetbarak, the king of Zagwe, into the church of Saint Qirqos at Ansata, slaying him.
