= Zagwe dynasty =

Kingdom in northern Ethiopia and Eritrea (1137–1270)

Zagwe dynasty መንግሥተ ዛጔ (Ge'ez)
- 1137–1270
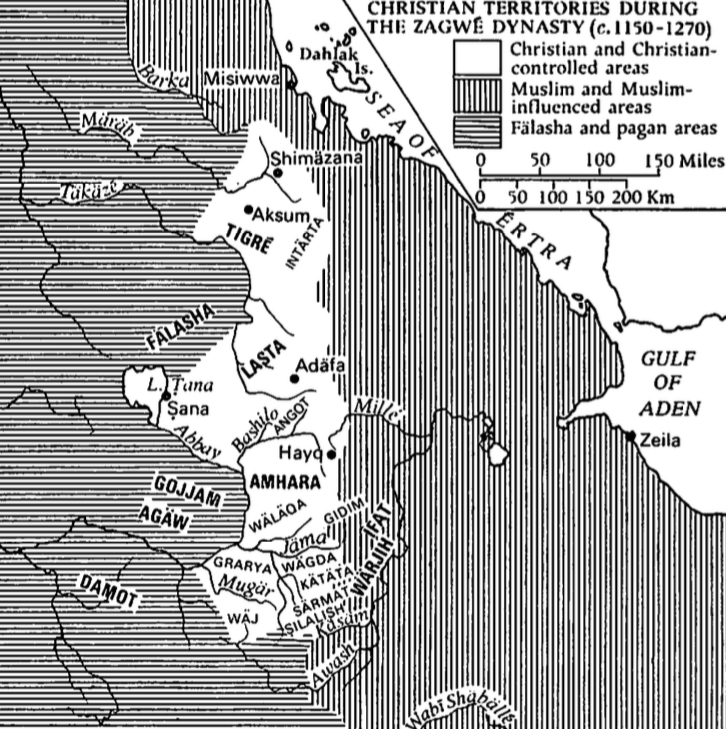
- Christian territories during the Zagwe dynasty circa 1200 AD
- Capital: Adefa
- Common languages: Agaw; Amharic; Ge'ez; Tigrinya
- Religion: Ethiopian Orthodox Tewahedo (official)
- Government: Absolute monarchy
- Negus (King)
  - early 12th century: Mara Takla Haymanot
  - 13th century: Yetbarak
- History
  - Other theories for the start: c. 930
  - Established: 1137
  - Battle of Ansata: 1270
Preceded by	Succeeded by
Kingdom of Aksum	Ethiopian Empire
- Today part of: Ethiopia; Eritrea

The Zagwe dynasty (Ge'ez: መንግሥተ ዛጔ) was a medieval Agaw monarchy that ruled the northern parts of Ethiopia and Eritrea. It ruled large parts of the territory from approximately 1137 to 1270 AD, when the last Zagwe Negus Za-Ilmaknun was killed in battle by the forces of the Amhara NegusYekuno Amlak. The Zagwe are most famous for their king Gebre Meskel Lalibela, who is credited with having ordered the construction of the rock-hewn monolithic churches of Lalibela.

The name "Zagwe" is thought to derive from the ancient Ge'ez phrase Ze-Agaw, meaning "of the Agaw", in reference to the Mara Tekle Haymanot, the founder of the dynasty. This term does not appear in contemporary sources, neither in indigenous documents nor in accounts of foreign observers.

Writer David Buxton has stated that the areas under the direct rule of the Zagwe kings apart from the centre of power in Lasta "probably embraced the highlands of modern Eritrea, Tigray, Wag and Bete Amhara and thence westwards towards Lake Tana (Begemder)." Unlike the practice of later rulers of Ethiopia, historian Taddesse Tamrat argues that under the Zagwe dynasty the order of succession was that of brother succeeding brother as king (Agnatic seniority), based on the Agaw laws of inheritance.

== History ==
According to one tradition, around 960, Queen Gudit destroyed the remnants of the Kingdom of Aksum, causing a shift in its temporal power centre that later regrouped more to the south. For 40 years she ruled over what remained of the kingdom, eventually passing on the throne to her descendants, with Mara marrying the daughter of the last king of Aksum, Dil Na'od. According to other Ethiopian traditional accounts, the last of her dynasty was overthrown by Mara Takla Haymanot in 1137. Still more, according to another tradition, Mara was born in the province of Lasta, which was his power base. Originally a general of Dil Na'od, whose daughter Masoba Warq became his wife, Mara overthrew his father-in-law to found the new dynasty. James Bruce, on the other hand, presents another tradition that Dil Na'od was overthrown by Gudit, and that Mara Takla Haymanot (whom Bruce calls "Takla Haymanot") was a cousin of Gudit who succeeded her after several of her own family.

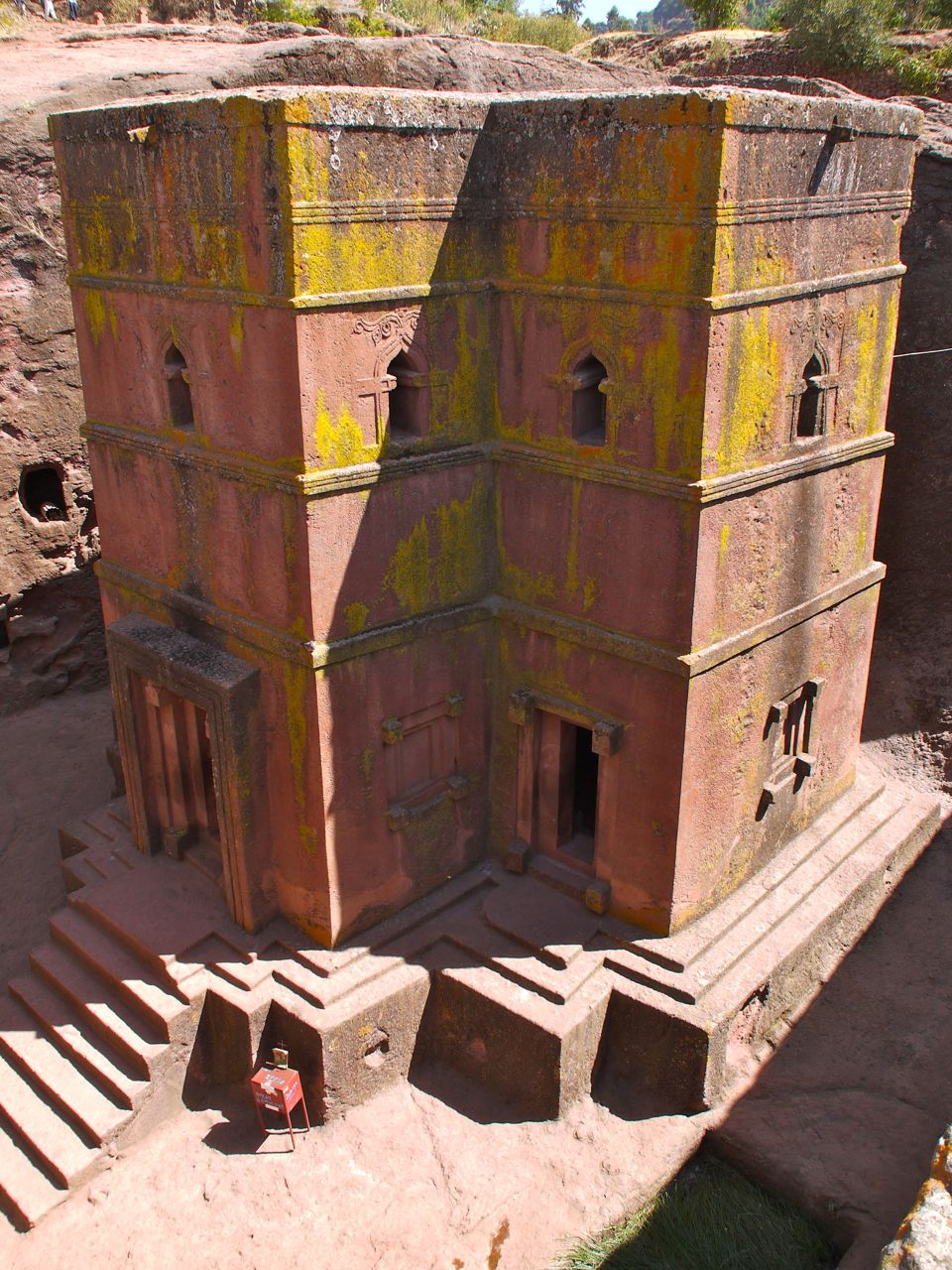
Church of Saint George, Lalibela constructed during the reign of King Gebre Mesqel Lalibela

Three inscriptions discovered in Axum mention the names of two kings, Dabra Ferem and his son Hasani Dan'el, who were Christian but are not recorded on Ethiopian regnal lists. The first inscription tells how Hasani Dan'el attacked rebel tribes in Kassala and claims that he conquered thirty peoples. The second inscription tells how the people of Welkait rebelled and laid waste to Axum, and in response he carried off large numbers of cattle and other animals from them. Dan'el then went to the country of the Maya and took 10,000 sheep and 3,000 cattle. The third inscription tells of how Dan'el went to Axum after his campaigns to be acknowledged as king and imprisoned the old king. It is difficult to date the reigns of these kings, but it likely occurred in the early 10th century when the power of the Solomonic line was in decline. Enno Littmann theorized that these kings were forerunners of the Zagwe dynasty and E.A. Wallis Budge believed they may have even founded the Zagwe line.

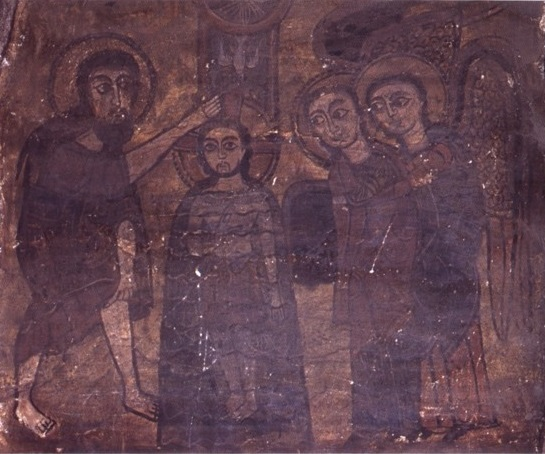
12th century mural showing the baptism of Jesus Christ. Yemrahana Krestos Church, Lalibela.

The Zagwe period is still shrouded in mystery; even the number of kings in this dynasty is disputed. Some sources (such as the Paris Chronicle, and manuscripts Bruce 88, 91, and 93) give the names of eleven kings who ruled for 354 years; others (among them the book Pedro Páez and Manuel de Almeida saw at Axum) list only five who ruled 143. Paul B. Henze reports the existence of at least one list containing 16 names.

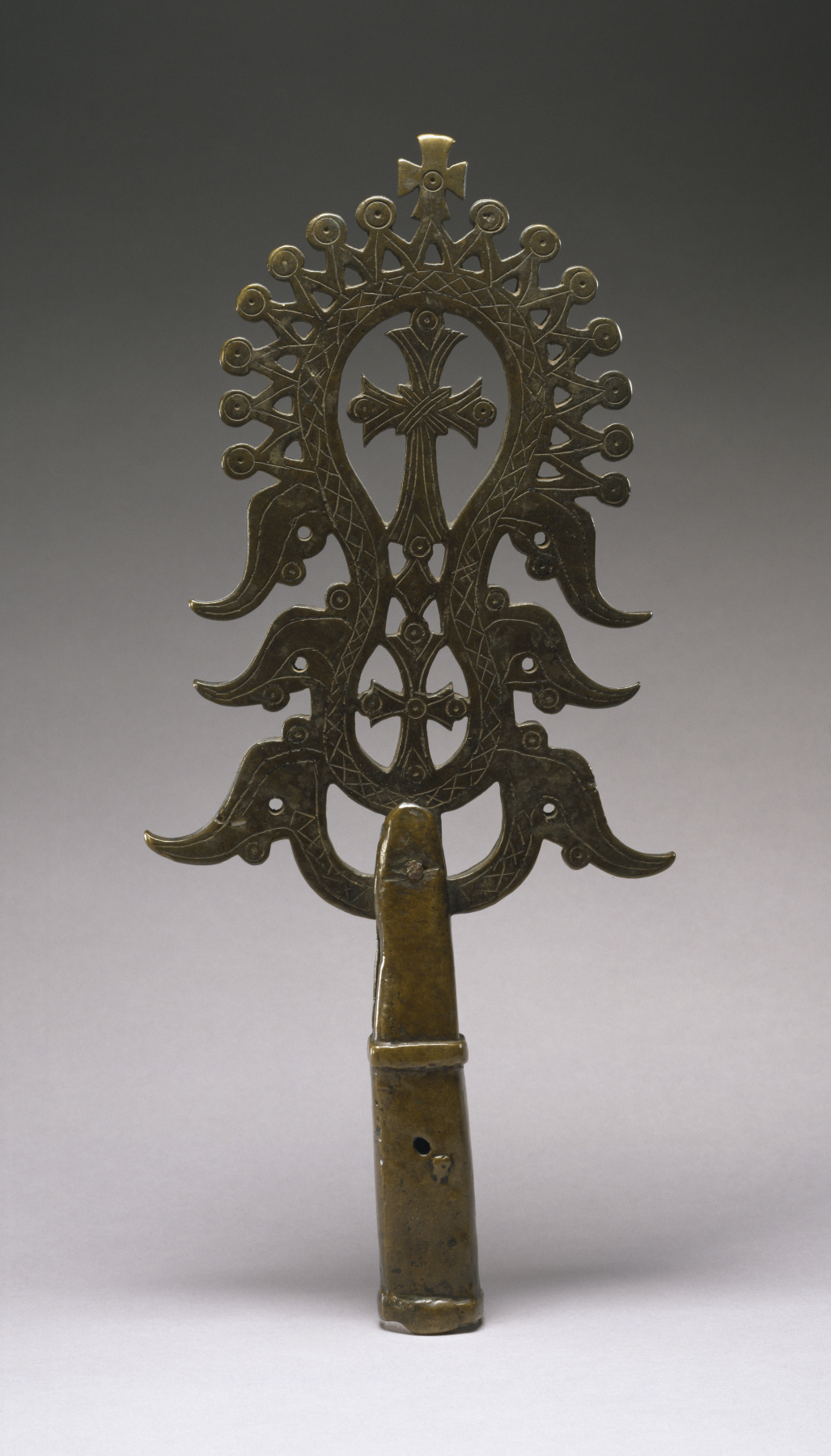
Processional cross, perhaps from Lasta. While undated it is, like similar shaped crosses, commonly associated with the Zagwe dynasty.

According to Carlo Conti Rossini, the shorter mooted length of this dynasty is the more likely one. He argues that a letter received by the Patriarch of Alexandria John V shortly before 1150 from an unnamed Ethiopian monarch, in which the Patriarch is asked for a new abuna because the current office holder was too old, was from Mara Takla Haymanot, who wanted the abuna replaced because he would not endorse the new dynasty.

The Zagwe historically fell victim to Jewish raids as they were possibly a militarily weak state having been defeated by Damot, the pre-eminent power in the region, when Zena Petros failed a campaign he led against them to extract tribute.

The mystery of the Zagwe dynasty is perhaps darkest around its replacement by the Solomonic dynasty under Yekuno Amlak. The name of the last Zagwe king is lost—the surviving chronicles and oral traditions give his name as Za-Ilmaknun, which is clearly a pseudonym (Taddesse Tamrat translates it as "The Unknown, the hidden one"), employed soon after his reign by the victorious Solomonic rulers in an act of damnatio memoriae. Taddesse Tamrat believes that this last ruler was actually Yetbarak. The end of the Zagwe came when Yekuno Amlak, who never personally claimed to be descendant of Dil Na'od or King Solomon, and acting under the guidance of either Saint Tekle Haymanot or Saint Iyasus Mo'a, pursued the last king of the Zagwe and killed him at the Battle of Ansata.

== Royal title ==
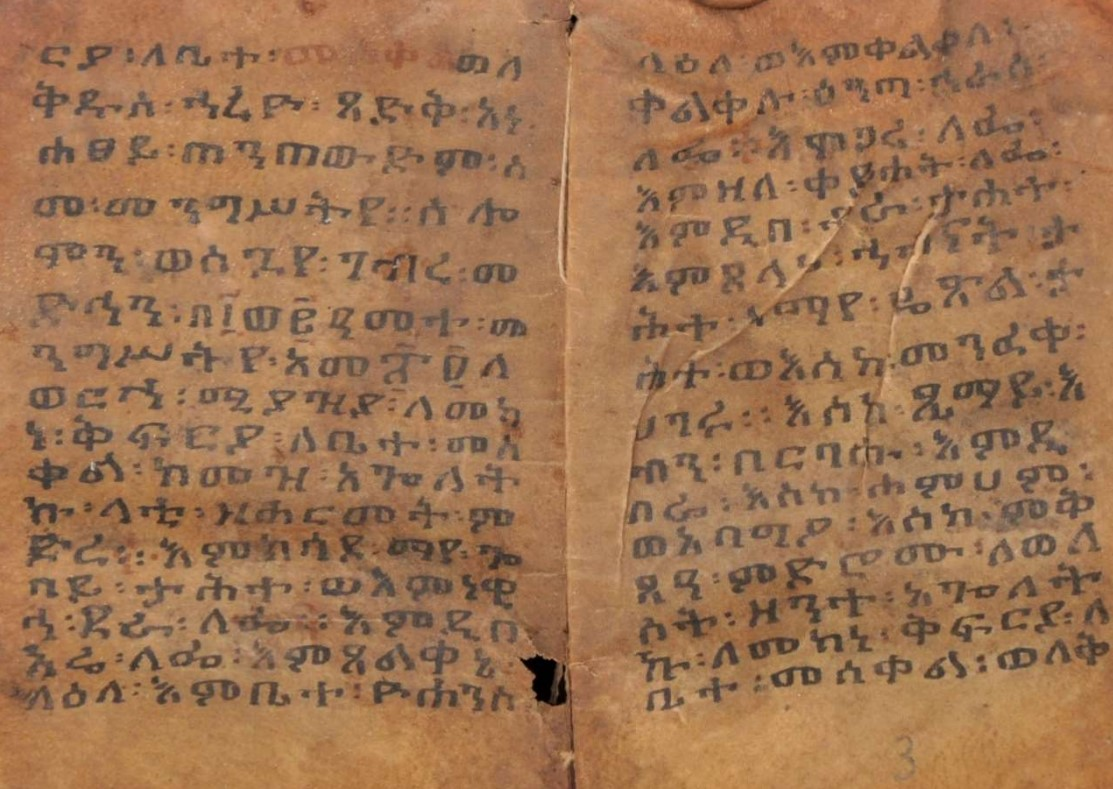
18th-century copy of land grant of King Tatadim (12th century) stored in the Ura Masqal church.

In his land grants of 1204 and 1225, Lalibela called himself negus ("king"), which was the traditional title for Ethiopian kings. Besides negus he also called himself hasani, which means as much as "tutor", "nurse" or "counselor". This title first appeared in a 10th-century account by Ibn Hawqal describing an anonymous Ethiopian king, but also features in two undated Ge'ez inscriptions and the 12th-century land grant of king Tantawedem. Lalibela's land grants are the last time hasani is associated with the king. By the reign of Amda Seyon in the first half of the 14th century it was used to denote a provincial governor.

Like the kings of Aksum who preceded them, the Zagwe kings bore three names: a baptismal name, a regnal name and finally the surname.

== Foreign relations ==
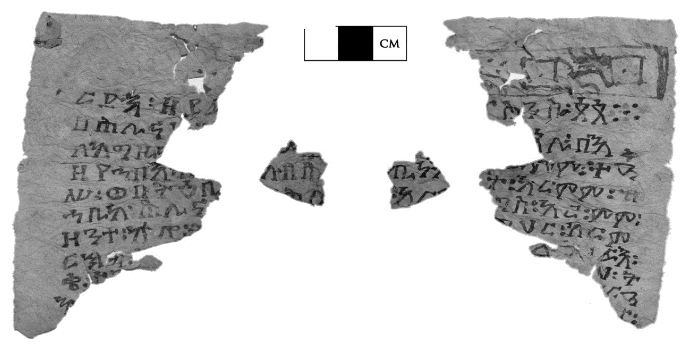
A fragmentary Ge'ez manuscript discovered in the Egyptian Monastery of Saint Anthony dated to 1160–1265.

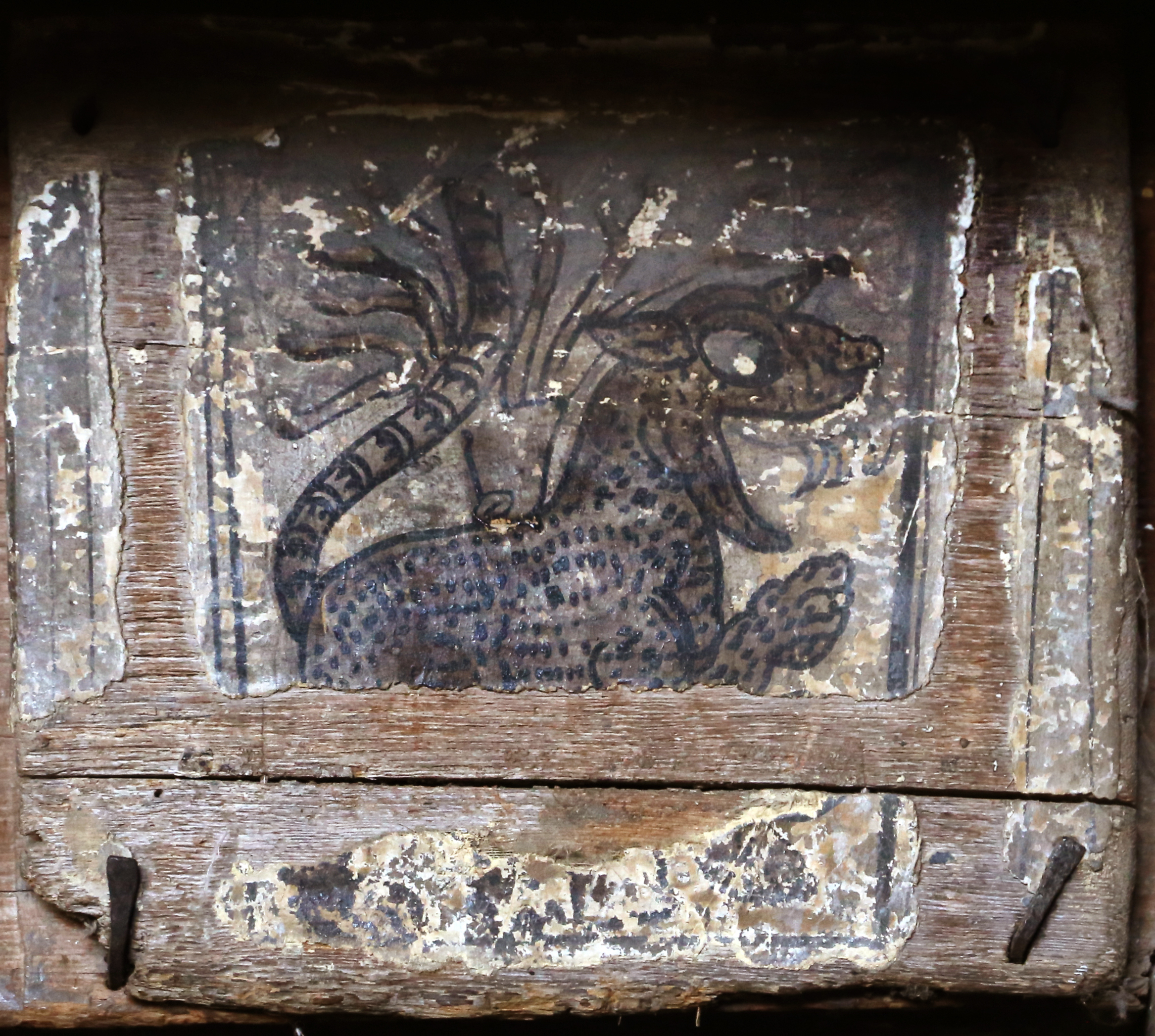
Plaque showing a lion, Yemrahana Krestos Church. Originally manufactured in southwestern India.

Unlike Aksum, the Zagwe were virtually unknown to the contemporary powers of the Mediterranean. The only regular relations seem to have been maintained with Egypt and Jerusalem. Although their presence is often claimed to have been of considerable antiquity, it is only in the 11th and 12th centuries when Ethiopians are firmly attested to have lived in Egypt. A rare testament for their presence during the reign of the Zagwe is a fragmentary manuscript written in Ge'ez that was recently discovered in the Monastery of Saint Anthony, dating to the mid-12th to mid-13th centuries.

The earliest sources confirming an Ethiopian community in Jerusalem date to the second half of the 13th century. Yet it is still probable that Ethiopians had lived there before. In the late 12th century, King Lalibela's knowledge of the town was sufficient to have inspired him during the expansion of his capital, adopting Jerusalem's form, attributions and toponyms.

== Islam ==
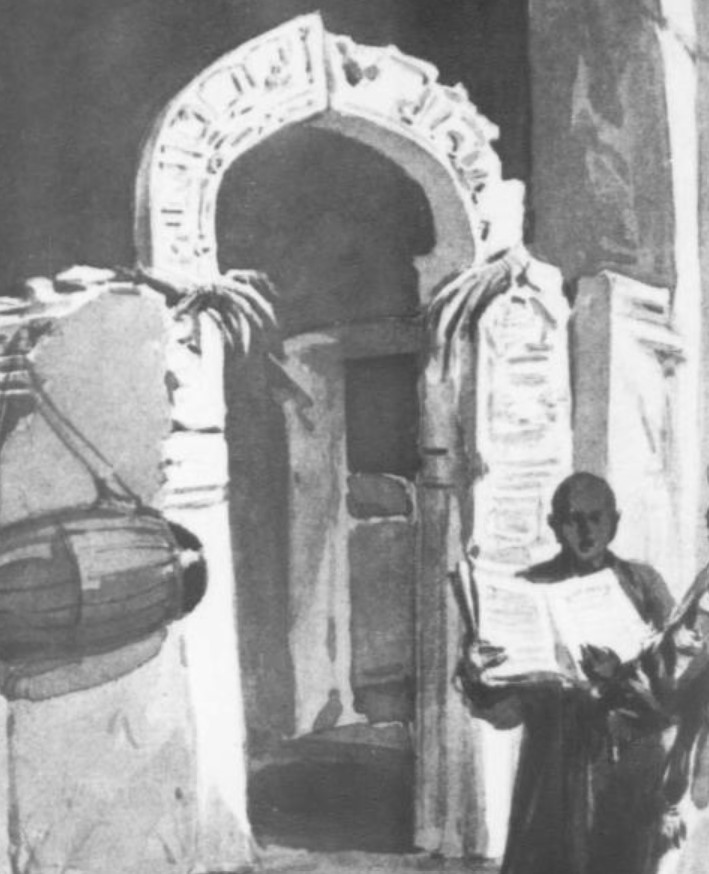
An 11th-century mosque frieze reappropriated as an arch inside the Wukro Chirkos church in Tigray. After a lithograph by William Simpson, 1868.

According to Muslim tradition, the companions of the Prophet briefly lived in Ethiopia in 622 after being exiled from Mecca in the First Hijra. However, there is no archaeological evidence for this. There is, however, evidence for a Muslim community (Note: It has been proposed that they were under influence of the Dahlak Sultanate. The much later hagiography of St. Marqorewos, who lived around the year 1400, mentions a Muslim king in nearby Shire who might have lived during the reign of king Lalibela.) in eastern Tigray during the Zagwe period, possibly being Shiites depending on Fatimid patronage. Arabic funerary steles discovered near Qwiha confirm the presence of a Muslim settlement between the 10th and 12th century, although its whereabouts are still unclear. Recent excavations at nearby Bilet found a Muslim cemetery in use from the late 10th to the mid-13th century, although most tombstones date to the 11th century. The nisbas of the deceased suggest links with Egypt, the Arabian Peninsula, and even Iran. Another Islamic cemetery was found at Arra 30 km southwards and was used between the mid-12th and mid-14th century, with most tombstones dating to the 13th century. A now broken frieze with a Kufic inscription stored in the Wukro Chirkos church probably dates to the second half of the 11th century and may have originally been from a mosque, perhaps sponsored by the Fatimid Caliphate. Tigray's Muslim community declined from the 12th century because of the collapse of the Fatimids and, if the land grant by king Tantawedem is to be believed, its dispossession by the Zagwe.

== List of kings ==
Surviving chronicles and manuscripts show variation in the number of kings and their individual length of reign. There are three main versions of the Zagwe line that are recorded, known as the 'short', 'long' and 'longer' lists.

=== Short list ===
Example list recorded by Pedro Páez contains 5 names.

- Mara Takla Haymanot (13 years)
- Yemrehana Krestos (40 years)
- Lalibela (40 years)
- Na'akueto La'ab (40 years)
- Harbai (8 years)

Approximate dates: c. 1179–1270 (141 years).

=== Long list ===
Example list below recorded by Carlo Conti Rossini contains 11 names. This version of the Zagwe dynasty was recorded on the 1922 regnal list.

- Mara Takla Haymanot (3 years) (The 1922 regnal list records 13 years of rule.)
- Tatadim (40 years)
- Jan Seyum (40 years)
- Germa Seyum (40 years)
- Yemrehana Krestos (40 years)
- Kedus Harbe (40 years)
- Lalibela (40 years)
- Na'akueto La'ab (48 years) (The 1922 regnal list records 40 years of rule.
- Yetbarak (40 years) (The 1922 regnal list records 17 years of rule.)
- Mairari (15 years) (Omitted from some versions of the long list.)
- Harbai (8 years) (Omitted from some versions of the long list.)

Approximate dates: c. 916–1270 (354 years).

=== Longer list ===
This list contains 16 names.

- Mara Takla Haymanot (13 years)
- Sibuhay (Dil Na'od II) (10 years) (not to be confused with the Axumite king Dil Na'od.)
- Mairari (15 years)
- Harbai (8 years)
- Mengisine Yitbarek I (7 years)
- Yi'kebke Egzi (10 years)
- Zena Petros (6 years)
- Bahr Saf (14 years)
- Tatadim (Ser Asagad) (10 years)
- Akotet (Jan Seyum) (20 years)
- Be'mnet (Germa Seyum) (20 years)
- Yemrehana Krestos (40 years)
- Gebre Maryam (Kedus Harbe) (40 years)
- Lalibela (40 years)
- Na'akueto La'ab (40 years)
- Yetbarak II (40 years)

Approximate dates: c. 937–1270 (333 years).

== See also ==
- Ethiopian historiography
- History of Ethiopia
- Kings of Axum
- List of Emperors of Ethiopia
