= Wukro Chirkos =

Church in Tigray Region, Ethiopia

Coordinates: 13°47′59″N 39°36′13″E

Wukro Chirkos (Amharic:ውቅሮ ጪርቆስ) is an Orthodox Tewahedo monolithic church located in northern Ethiopia, on the northern edge of the town of Wukro near the main highway. From the time members of the 1868 British Expedition to Abyssinia reported its existence until the early 20th century, it was the only rock-hewn church known to the outside world.

Wukro Chirkos is dedicated to the child martyr Cyricus of Tarsus of the Ethiopian Orthodox Tewahedo Church. Due to its location, this church remains the most accessible example of these structures.

== Description ==
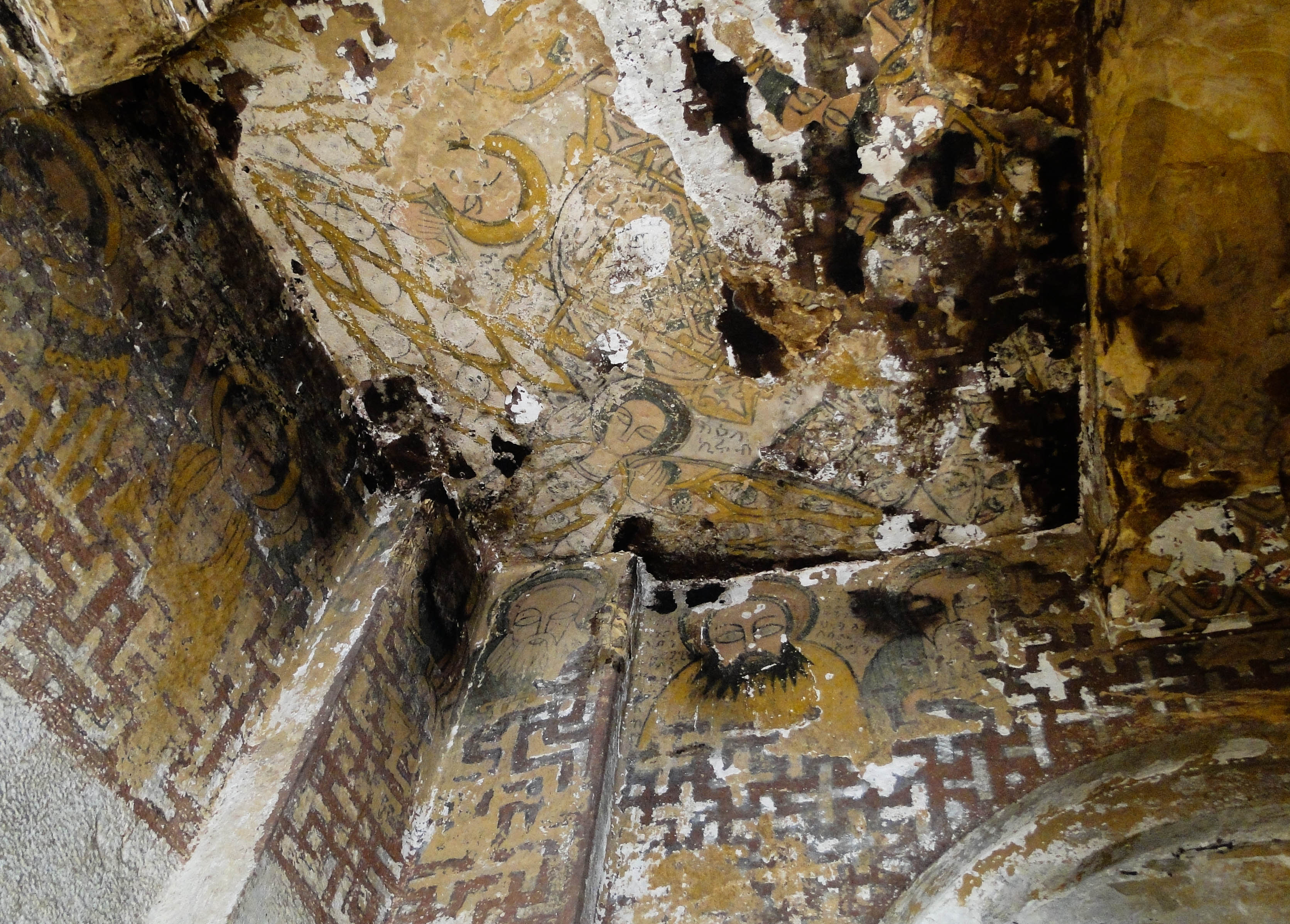
Paintings inside the church

Wukro Chirkos
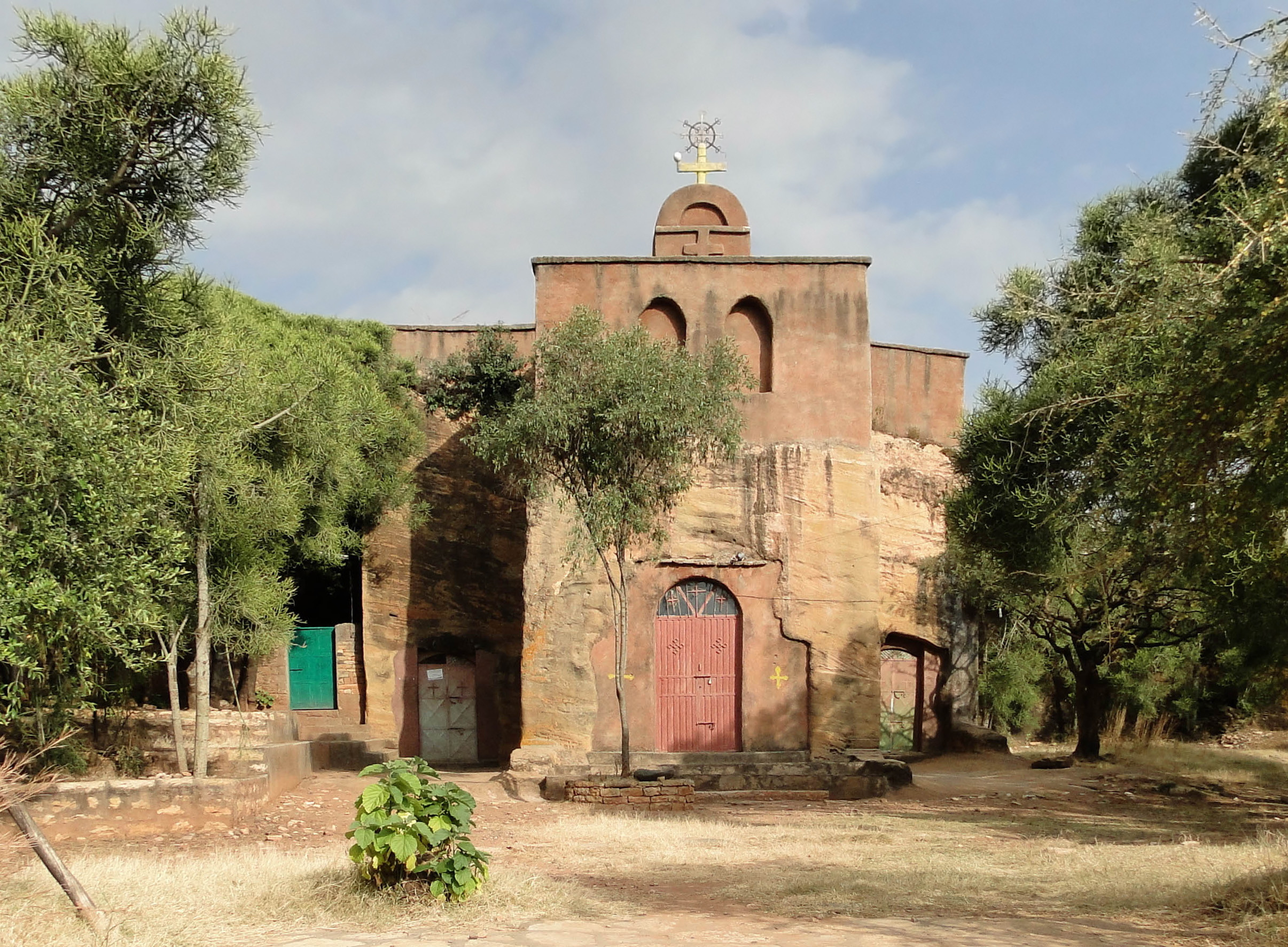
- Wukro Chirkos

Religion
- Affiliation: Ethiopian Orthodox Tewahedo Church
- Region: Tigray
- Ecclesiastical or organisational status: Cathedral
- Year consecrated: circa 700-1000 CE
- Status: Active

Location
- Location: Wukro, Tigray Region, Ethiopia
- Interactive map of Wukro Chirkos

Architecture
- Type: church

The layout of this church is generally described as cruciform or "cross-in-square". As a result, it is frequently grouped with other churches with the same floor plan; namely Abreha we Atsbeha and Mikael Imba. Although the structure's interior is divided into three or five aisles -- "depending on how one describes the intermediary supports in the transverse section" according to Ruth Plant—its cruciform layout is emphasized by the barrel vault in line with the apse and the sanctuary containing the tabot. Plant identified Axumite detail acting as frieze above the columns in the three arms of the crossing. The column shafts are chamfered, rising from bases upon the floor, and the capitals of the smaller columns are squared with elliptical chamfered edges. Plant wrote that the bracket capitals of the columns at the crossing are not as refined as the corresponding columns of Abreha we Atsbeha.

Like the other Ethiopian cruciform churches mentioned above, the entrance porch of Wukro Chirkos is distinguished by a central pillar that forces the priests and congregants to enter on either side, rather than a direct line.

== History ==
Stuart Munro-Hay was told that Wukro Chirkos was constructed during the reign of the two brother kings, Abreha and Atsbeha. However, David Buxton dated the construction of Wukro Chirkos to a period between the creation of Medhane Alem Adi Kasho yet a century before the construction of the churches of Lalibela. More recently, David Phillipson has dated the group of cross-in-square churches between AD 700 and 1000.

The church's walls and ceilings show signs of damage from fire, which local tradition attributes to a 16th-century sack by Ahmad ibn Ibrahim al-Ghazi. The churchyard includes the remains of several Italians interred there during the time of the Second Italo-Ethiopian War. Around 1958, a cement floor was added and the roof to the porch was raised. Munro-Hay notes a number of modern improvements which include a modern bell-tower and a new gatehouse to the compound around the church.

== See also ==
- Yemrehana Krestos Church
