= Tatadim =

King of Zagwe dynasty in the 11th century

King of Zagwe dynasty
- Reign: 1013 – 1056
- Predecessor: Zena Petros
- Successor: Jan Seyum
- Dynasty: Zagwe dynasty
- Father: Mara Takla Haymanot
- Mother: Masoba Warq
- Religion: Ethiopian Orthodox Church

Tatadim (Ge'ez: ታታዲም) also known as Tantawedem, was a king of the Zagwe dynasty. According to Taddesse Tamrat, he was a son of Mara Takla Haymanot. His throne name was Solomon.

== Reign ==
Tatadim's name appears in second place in the long lists of the Zagwe kings. Taddesse Tamrat states that he was the oldest known son of Mara Takla Haymanot.

According to the Gadla Yemrehana Krestos, Tatadim made efforts to secure the succession of kingship for his sons, taking actions against his brothers Jan Seyum and Germa Seyum. The Agaw law of inheritance dictated that his brothers should be his successors, a problem that plagued the Zagwe kings.

Regnal titles
Preceded by Mara Takla Haymanot	Emperor of Ethiopia	Succeeded by Jan Seyum
