= Wag Province =

Highland district in the Amhara Region

Coordinates: 12°30′N 39°00′E

Administrative divisions of Ethiopia between 1921 and 1936. Haile Selassie would redraw the province after World War II.

Wag (Amharic: ዋግ) is a traditional Highland district in the Amhara Region of Ethiopia, in the approximate location of the modern Wag Hemra Zone. Weld Blundell described the district as bounded on the south by the mountains of Lasta, on the east and north by the Tellare River, and the west by the Tekezé. The major urban center is the town of Sokota, which has been a major marketplace for centuries.

James Bruce states that Wag was given to the heirs of the deposed Zagwe dynasty, when the Solomonic dynasty was restored to the throne of Ethiopia in 1270. The head of the fallen Zagwe family accepted the district as well as the title of Wagshum as part of the settlement for their loss. However, the province is mentioned for the first time only in the 14th century. Mugahid of Adal led the conquest of Wag in the sixteenth century.
