= Gebre Meskel Lalibela =

King of Zagwe dynasty from 1181 to 1221

Lalibela ላሊበላ
- Negus
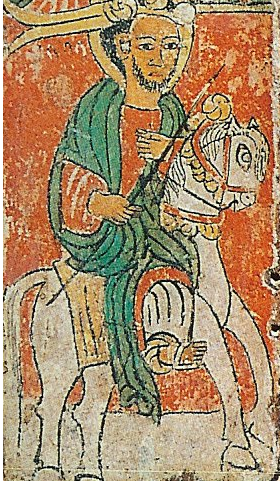
- 15th-century Ethiopian painting of King Lalibela

King of Zagwe dynasty
- Reign: 1181–1221
- Predecessor: Kedus Harbe
- Successor: Na'akueto La'ab
- Born: 1162; Roha, Lasta
- Died: 1221 (aged 58–59)
- Burial: Bete Golgotha church, Lalibela, Ethiopia
- Spouse: Masqal Kibra
- Issue: Yetbarak; Judith
Regnal name
- Gebre Meskel
- Dynasty: Zagwe dynasty
- Father: Jan Seyum
- Religion: Ethiopian Orthodox Christian

Gebre Meskel Lalibela
- Venerated in: Ethiopian Orthodox Tewahedo Church
- Major shrine: Bete, Golgotha Church, Lalibela, Ethiopia
- Feast: 19 June

Lalibela (Ge'ez: ላሊበላ), regnal name Gebre Meskel (Ge'ez: ገብረ መስቀል, romanized: gäbrä mäsqäl, lit. 'Servant of the Cross'), was a king of the Zagwe dynasty, reigning from 1181 to 1221. He was the son of Jan Seyum and the brother of Kedus Harbe. Perhaps the best-known Zagwe monarch, he is credited as the patron of the namesake monolithic rock-hewn churches of Lalibela. He is venerated as a saint by the Ethiopian Orthodox Tewahedo Church on 19 June.

== Biography ==
The life of Lalibela is recorded in his hagiography, Gadla Lalibela. According to the source, his parents were Jan Seyoum, the governor of Bugna in the province of Lasta, and Kirwerna, a housemaid in Jan Seyoum's service. In 1162 Jan Seyoum was angered when Kirwerna became pregnant by him, and she fled to the town of Roha to give birth. A swarm of bees was said to have surrounded the newborn child, which his mother took as a sign of his future power. Accordingly he was named "Lalibela", meaning "the bees recognise his sovereignty" in Old Agaw. Later Roha was renamed Lalibela in the king's honor. The prophecy of Lalibela's future greatness aroused the hostility of his uncle Tatadim and his brother Kedus Harbe, who was rightful sovereign. Forced into exile, Lalibela spent many years in Jerusalem. He returned to Lasta long enough to marry Meskel Kibra, who fled with him after renewed murderous attempts by Harbe.

=== Rise to power ===
Lalibela's Gadla does not explain his eventual rise to power. The event occurred during Harbe's lifetime, leading Taddesse Tamrat to suspect that Lalibela took the crown by force of arms. A chronicle from Gojjam says that Harbe's continued persecution of Lalibela precipitated a battle between the two brothers. Lalibela was allied with the Amhara people, who had been promised key court positions if his cause succeeded, while Harbe retained local support, rallying the seven clans of the Agaw people behind him. Having won the battle and seized the throne, Lalibela exiled the Agaws from Lasta and allowed the Amhara to settle in their place. Hence the Amharic proverb: "Amhara settled, Agaw exiled". Allegedly Amharic was made Lessana Negus (language of the king), and Amhara nobles received their promised offices at court.

=== Reign ===
A vision is said to have inspired Lalibela to build a new Jerusalem as his capital, in response to the capture of old Jerusalem by Muslim forces led by Saladin in 1187. As such, many features of the town of Lalibela have Biblical names, including its watercourse, the River Jordan (Amharic: ዮርዳኖስ ወንዝ, romanized: Yordanos Wenz). The city remained the capital of Ethiopia from the late 12th century into the 13th century.

No details survive about the construction of the capital's 11 monolithic churches. The later Gadla Lalibela states that the king carved these churches out of stone with only the help of angels. According to the narrative of the Portuguese embassy to Ethiopia in 1520-6, written down by Father Francisco Álvares and published in 1540, the Lalibelian priests claimed that the churches took 24 years to construct.

Lalibela's chief queen was Masqal Kibra, about whom a few traditions have survived. She induced Abuna Mikael to make her brother Hirun a bishop, but the two men feuded over authority and Mikael eventually left Ethiopia for Egypt. Another tradition states that she convinced King Lalibela to abdicate in favor of his nephew Na'akueto La'ab, who proved a poor ruler; after 18 months Lalibela resumed the throne, again on Masqal Kibra's initiative. Taddesse Tamrat suspects that the end of Lalibela's rule was not actually this amiable, and argues that the tradition masks a brief usurpation of Na'akueto La'ab, whose reign was ended by Lalibela's son, Yetbarak. Getachew Mekonnen credits Masqal Kibra with having one of the rock-hewn churches, Bet Abba Libanos, built as a memorial for Lalibela after his death.

Although little written material survives concerning the other Zagwe kings, Lalibela's reign is covered by an abundance of texts, of which the Gadla Lalibela is only a part. An embassy from the Patriarch of Alexandria visited Lalibela's court around 1210, leaving an account of him and of his successors Na'akueto La'ab and Yetbarak. The Italian scholar Carlo Conti Rossini has also edited and published the several land grants that survive from his reign.

Regnal titles
Preceded by Kedus Harbe	Emperor of Ethiopia; 1181–1221	Succeeded by Na'akueto La'ab
