= Lalibela (yacht) =

Yacht which was destroyed by fire in Port Camille Rayon on October 13, 2018

Lalibela was a 42 metres (138 ft) yacht which was destroyed by fire, while docked in Port Camille Rayon, Golfe Juan, on October 13, 2018.

Only two crew members were aboard, when the fire was discovered. They escaped safely, but two firefighters were injured. The vessel top two decks were destroyed, and it is reported to be a total loss.

The vessel was being chartered, at €75,000 per week.

== Design and construction ==
The vessel was built in 1972, and underwent a refit in 2013.

She had accommodation for eight crew members, and provided three double staterooms, and three twin staterooms, for passengers, as well as a luxurious lounge and dining room.

Her cruising speed was 12 knots (22 km/h). She is powered by twin 814 shaft horsepower (607 kW) engines.
