= Zena Petros =

10th-century king in east Africa

King of Zagwe dynasty
- Reign: 983–989 E.C. (Traditional)
- Predecessor: Yi'kebke Egzi
- Successor: Bahr Saf
- Dynasty: Zagwe
- Religion: Ethiopian Orthodox Church

Zena Petros was a king of the Zagwe Dynasty.

Zena Petros campaigned against the Kingdom of Damot and its ruler Motolomi Sato because he failed to pay tribute. He was accompanied by priest with their Tabots (or Arks) but was defeated and killed. He was beheaded and his skull was later used as a measurement for grain.

Multiple lists of Zagwe kings are known to exist, containing 5, 9, 11 or 16 names. Zena Petros is only named on the longest list of rulers, placed between kings named Yi'kebke Egzi and Bahr Saf, who also only appear on this version of the Zagwe king list. The list states that Zena Petros reigned for six years. If the reign lengths on this list are to be trusted, then his reign dates would be approximately 983–989 E.C..

Some sources claim he was the father of Na'akueto La'ab. However, the official regnal list places 184 years between their reigns, so this is unlikely.

== Bibliography ==
- Sergew Hable Sellassie (1972). Ancient and Medieval Ethiopian History to 1270. Addis Ababa: United Printers.
