= Yemrehana Krestos Church =

Ethiopian Orthodox church in Amhara Region, Ethiopia

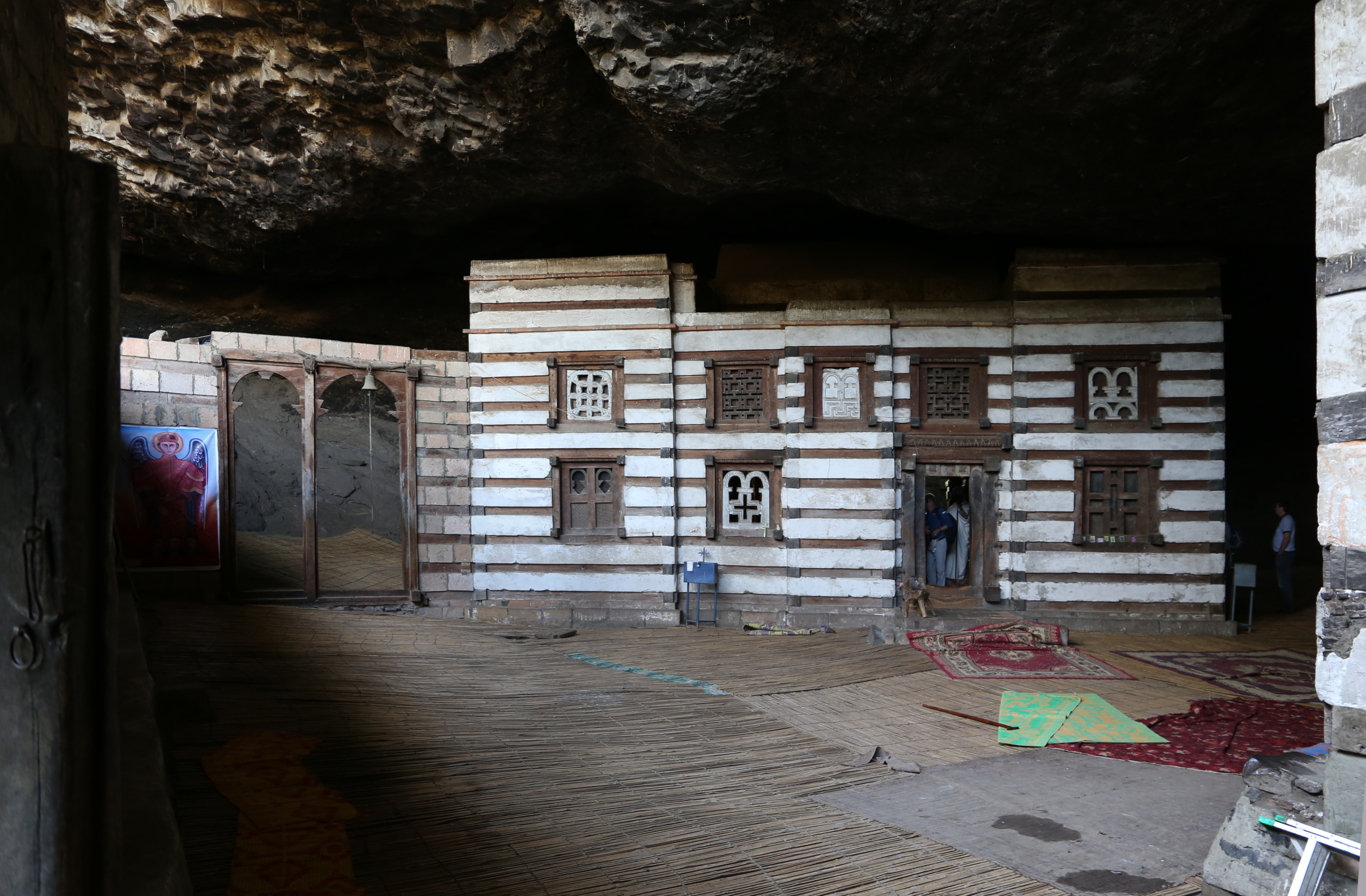
- Yemrehana Krestos Cathedral

Religion
- Affiliation: Ethiopian Orthodox Tewahedo Church
- Rite: Alexandrian Rite
- Patron: Yemrehana Krestos
- Status: Active

Location
- Location: Lalibela, Amhara Region, Ethiopia
- Interactive map of Yemrehana Krestos Church
- Coordinates: 12°08′23″N 39°04′19″E

Architecture
- Type: church
- Style: Aksumite
- Groundbreaking: 11th / 12th century

Yemrehana Krestos Church (ይምርሃነ ክርስቶስ ቤተክርስቲያን) is an Ethiopian Orthodox church located in Amhara Region, northern Ethiopia.

Built of stone and wood, it was erected in the architectural tradition of the ancient Kingdom of Aksum. The church is not dated but was probably constructed in the 11th or 12th century.

== Location ==
The cavern and church are located at Coordinates: 12°8'22"N 39°4'19"E. The church was constructed in large northeast-facing cavern on the west side of Mount Abuna Yosef. The site is located 12.2 km directly north-east of Lalibela and until the construction of a road in 2000, according to David Phillipson, this church was reachable only after "a long day's arduous journey on foot or mule." The nearest town is Bilbala, about 10 km to the west.

== History ==
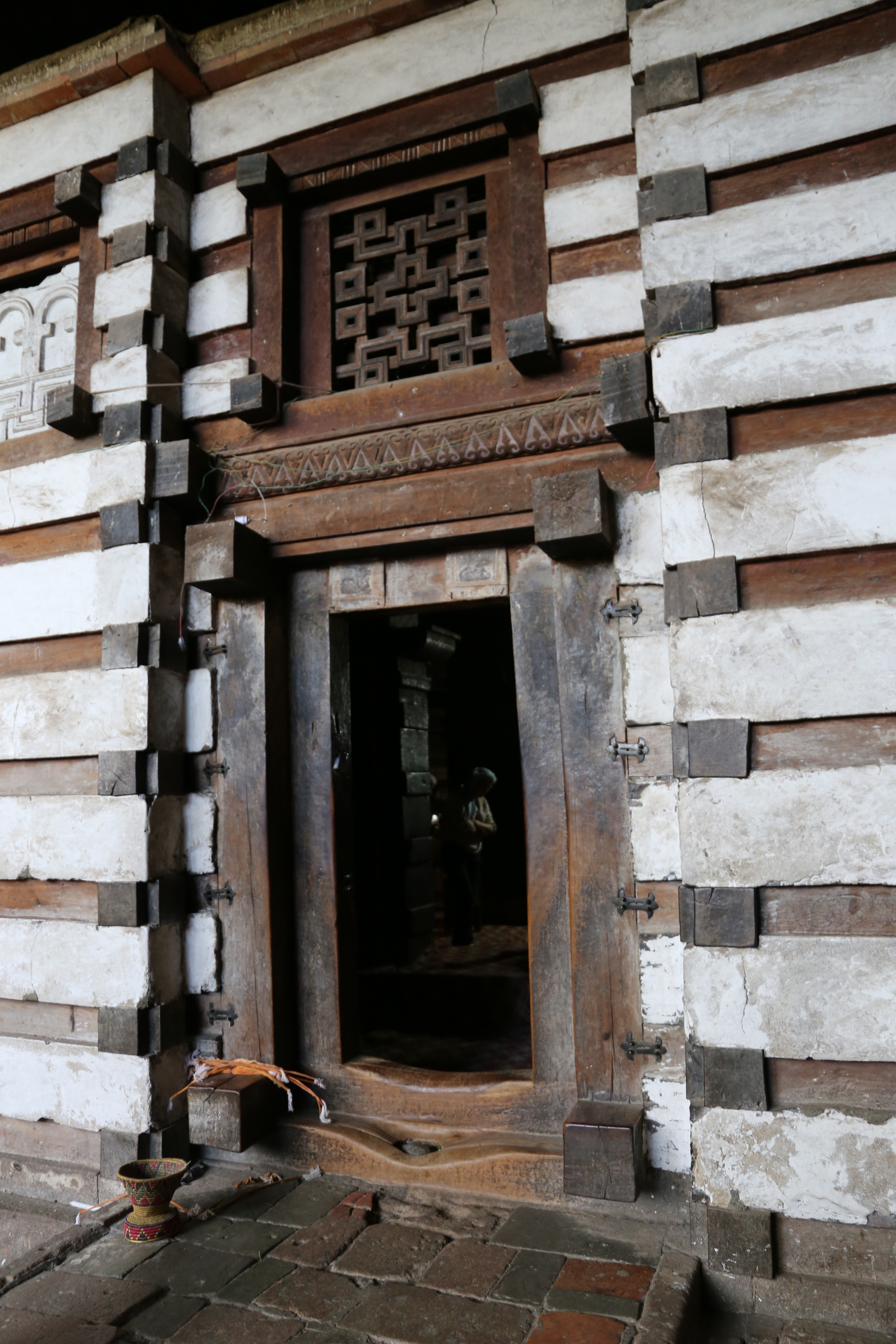
Entrance to the Yemrehanna Krestos church

The construction of the church is credited to Yemrehana Krestos. The building is notable for its resemblance to the ancient church on Debre Damo, with walls that, according to Phillipson, "show a similar horizontal pattern of inset beams and projecting stonework", with "wooden quoins, door- and window-frames [that] are essentially Aksumite in style". Stuart Munro-Hay believes that the church's interior decorations make "Yimrehana Krestos the most elaborate of all known ancient Ethiopian churches." Mural paintings high on the nave walls are considered the oldest surviving mural paintings in Ethiopia. The cave also contains a second structure north of the church, which tradition describes as a palace or residence of Negus Yemrehana Krestos, but now serves as a residence and storage space for the local priests.

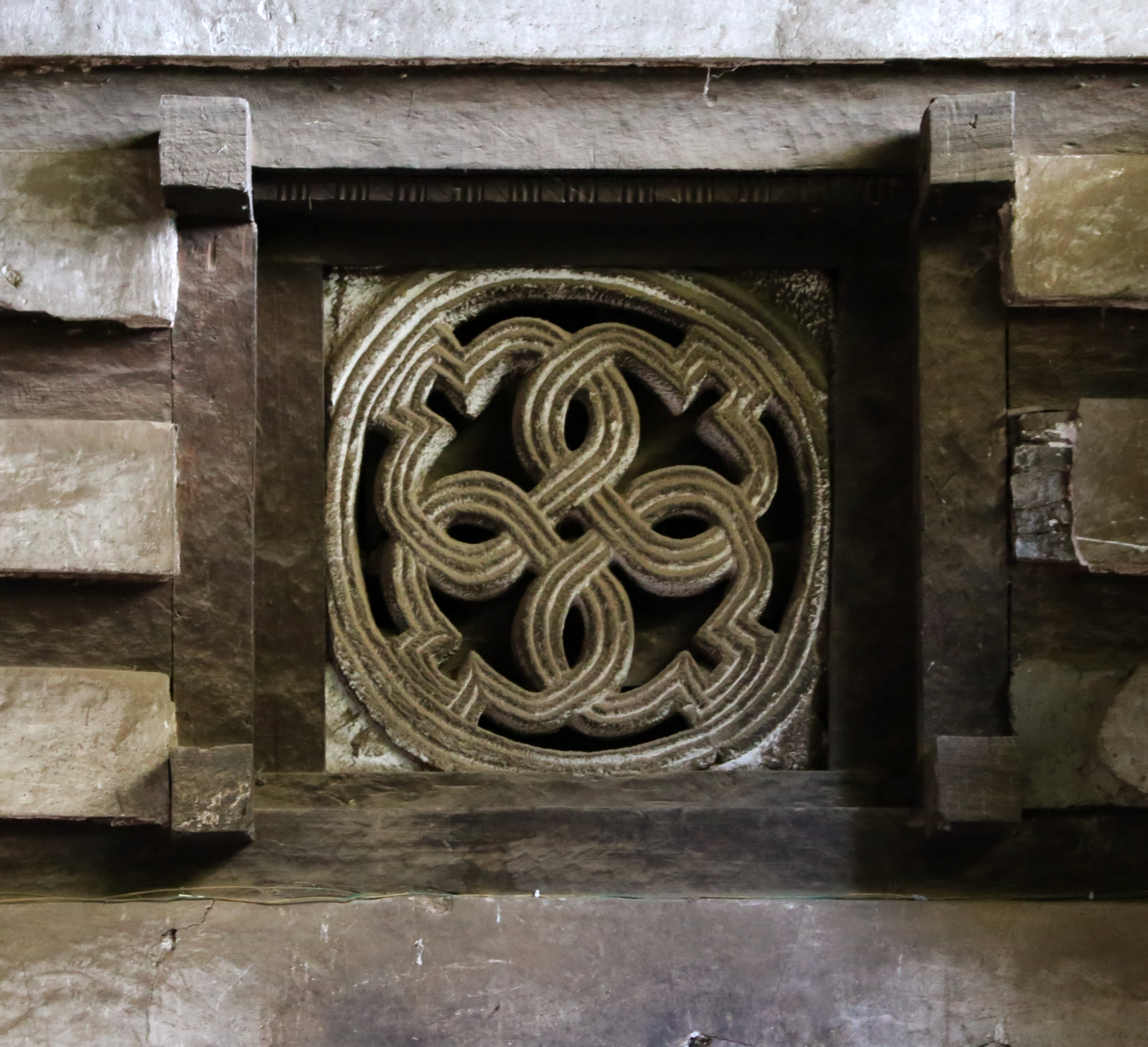
Emblem at the Yemrehana Krestos Church

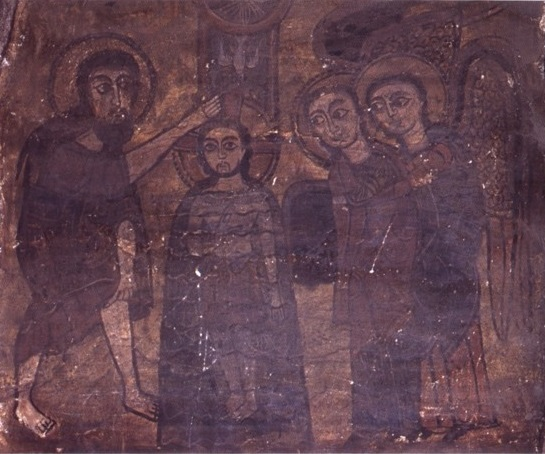
12th century mural showing the baptism of Jesus Christ.

Alvarez left a description of what the church looked like in the early 16th century, in his Prester John of the Indies. Taddesse suggests that construction of this church is related to the record of an Ethiopian delegation that came to Caliph Saladin in 1173, and is recorded as presenting a letter and many gifts to the Caliph; in the Gadla Yemrehana Krestos, there is a passage that relates how he obtained the door from the Caliph's palace for his church. This would agree with Phillipson's dating of this church to either the 11th or 12th century. Paul B. Henze provides a list of several other rock-hewn churches attributed to this king.

South of the church is a tomb which Munro-Hay describes as "a substantial cloth-covered structure", and alongside it a smaller one said to belong to his slave, Ebna Yemrehana Krestos. Munro-Hay reports he was told that in the cave behind the church "are many skeletons of monks and others, who have been buried in this holy spot, some dating from Yimrehana Krestos' time.". Indeed, there is a large area at the back of the cave with numerous skeletons, several wrapped in reed mats. While preservation is generally poor, a few skulls retain their hair.

The entrance of the cave is closed by a modern wall, built in the 1980s to replace an older one.

== See also ==
- Wukro Chirkos
