= Jan Seyum =

King of Zagwe dynasty in the 11th century

King of Zagwe dynasty
- Reign: 1056 A.D.-Late 11th Century
- Predecessor: Tatadim
- Successor: Germa Seyum
- Dynasty: Zagwe dynasty
- Religion: Ethiopian Church

Jan Seyum (Ge'ez: ጃን ስዩም) was King of Zagwe dynasty.

Regnal titles
Preceded by Tatadim	Emperor of Ethiopia	Succeeded by Germa Seyum
