= Lasta =

Historic district in Amhara Region, Ethiopia

Coordinates: 12.0356°N 39.0472°E

Lasta ላስታ
- Interactive map of Lasta
- Country: Ethiopia

Lasta (Amharic: ላስታ Lāstā) is a historic province in northern Ethiopia located in the Amhara Region. It is the province in which Lalibela is situated, the former capital of Ethiopia during the Zagwe dynasty and home to 11 medieval rock-hewn churches.

== History ==
Lasta and Wag were the ancestral homelands of the Central-Cushitic-speaking Agaw people. Christianity is believed to have reached the region as early as the 6th century, during the reigns of Kaleb and Gebre Meskel. Kaleb is traditionally credited with the construction of the rock-hewn churches of Balbala Kirkos and Balbala Giyorgis, while Gebre Meskel is said to have founded the churches of Ledata Maryam and Madoane Alam.

Between approximately 1150 and 1270, Lasta served as the power base of the Zagwe dynasty, which administered the country from its political court in Roha, now known as Lalibela—named after one of the dynasty's most renowned kings. During the Zagwe rule, a significant number of rock-hewn churches were built, with King Lalibela himself believed to have constructed twelve churches in his capital.

Following the decline of the Zagwe dynasty and the rise of the Solomonic dynasty in 1270, the traditional rulers of Lasta and Wag held the esteemed title of "Wagshum" and claimed descent from Adil, the son of David and brother of King Solomon. This lineage, which competed with the Solomonic tradition, enabled the successors of the Zagwe dynasty to retain respect and influence even after their loss of power.

In the 17th century, Lasta gained strategic importance as a bastion of Orthodox Christianity during the reign of Emperor Susenyos I, who had converted to Catholicism. The rebellion in defense of Orthodoxy, led by Melkeua Kristos, was centered in the mountain region of Emekina, deep in Lasta. Susenyos I launched several military campaigns but failed to suppress the rebellion, eventually renouncing Catholicism in 1632. Subsequent Gondarine kings repeatedly mobilized armies to bring Lasta and Wag under imperial control, which had resisted both imperial authority and religious policy in the 17th and 18th centuries.

In the 18th century the Czech Franciscan Remedius Prutky listed Lasta as one of the 22 provinces of Ethiopia still subject to the Emperor, but singled Lasta out as one of the six he considered "large and truly deserving of the name of kingdom."

Under Emperor Menelik II, Ras Kassa Haile Darge, a descendant of the rulers of Shewa and Lasta, was appointed governor of Lasta. A dispute over the control of Bugna, central and western Lasta, ensued, but in 1919, the court of Ras Tafari (later Emperor Haile Selassie) ruled in favor of Ras Kassa, formalizing the separation of Lasta and Wag.

After liberation from Italian occupation in 1941, Lasta became an awragga within Begemder province, governed first by Ras Kassa and later by his son, Aserate Kassa. Eventually, control passed to Wollo, ruled by Crown Prince Amha Selassie. Since 1991, Lasta has maintained its awragga status within the North Wollo Zone, with its capital at Weldiya.

== See also ==
- Lasta (woreda), the present district of the same name
- Wagshum
