= Taddesse Tamrat =

Ethiopian historian and scholar (1935–2013)

- Born: 4 August 1935; Addis Ababa, Ethiopian Empire
- Died: 23 May 2013 (aged 77); Chicago, Illinois, U.S.
- Education: Haile Selassie I University (BA); SOAS University of London (MA, PhD)
- Occupations: Historian; Scholar
- Years active: 1962–2013
- Known for: Contribution of Ethiopian studies
- Notable work: Church and State in Ethiopia 1270–1520 (1972)

Taddesse Tamrat (Amharic: ታደሰ ታምራት; 4 August 1935 – 23 May 2013) was an Ethiopian historian and scholar of Ethiopian studies. He is best known as the author of Church and State in Ethiopia 1270–1520 (1972, Oxford University Press ISBN 0198216718), a book which has dominated the field of Ethiopian studies since that time.

== Biography ==
Taddesse Tamrat was born in Addis Ababa in the Ethiopian Empire to a family of Ethiopian Orthodox Tewahedo clerics. He received a traditional Ethiopian Orthodox Tewahedo religious education and was ordained as a deacon. As a young man he began his studies at Holy Trinity Cathedral in Addis Ababa, but his father insisted that he study at a more traditional ecclesiastical school to properly learn the Ge’ez language. He returned to Addis Ababa and graduated from Haile Selassie I University with a Bachelor of Arts in History in 1962. Following that, he received a scholarship to the School of Oriental and African Studies in London where he earned his Doctorate in the same subject. As a student there, he presented a seminar paper of some notes on the fifteenth century Stefanite heresy in the Ethiopian Church, which on the advice of his mentors Roland Oliver and Edward Ullendorf was submitted to and published in Rassegna di Studi Etiopici, his first article published outside of Ethiopia. It demonstrated his rich grounding in traditional Ethiopian Orthodox sources and his interaction with the broader academic world.

He taught history at Haile Selassie I University, which became Addis Ababa University after the 1974 revolution. He became the director of the Institute of Ethiopian Studies there and was active in organizing the meetings of the International Conference of Ethiopian Studies.

He received the Medal of Honor at the Collège de France and was named an Honorary Fellow at the School of Oriental and African Studies. The Manuscript Department of the Institute of Ethiopian Studies was named in his honor. He and his wife Almaz were married for 45 years.

During the later years, Taddesse was treated for an illness at a hospital in Chicago. His wife died in July 2012. He himself died on 23 May 2013, and was survived by three daughters.
