= Za Zalis =

Early-Mid 1st century King of Aksum

King of Aksum
- Reign: Early First Century C.E.-Mid First Century C.E.
- Predecessor: Bazen of Axum (unsure)
- Successor: Za Haqala

Za Zalis was a King of Axum from the Early First Century C.E. to the Mid First Century C.E.

== History ==
Not much is known about Za Zalis' reign other than that he was the Predecessor of Za Haqala of Axum.
