= Lake Monoleus =

Lake Monoleus was a coastal feature mentioned by Pliny as being on the Red Sea Coast near Ptolemais Theron. The lake was probably a coastal lagoon.

According to Pliny the city of Ptolemais Theron was situated adjacent to Lake Monoleus at a distance of 4820 stadia from Berenice and located in Æthiopia, though modern Eritrea is more probable.

The lake must have been not connected to the Red Sea as the Periplus of the Erythraean Sea chapter 3 written (mid 1st century) notes that Ptolemais Theron had "no harbor, and can only be reached by small boats".

The location of the lake (if that is what it was) remains unknown, though several locations have been conjectured.

- G.W.B. Huntingford notes that Ptolemais (hence Lake Monocleus) has been identified both with the locales of Arqiqo and also Suakin, and notes that Suakin lay at the end of an ancient caravan route that links it to Barbar on the Nile. Ariqiqo, alternatively, derives its name from the local word for elephant and is known for its mangrove shallows, one interpretation of the lake.
- Stanley M. Burstein argues for Trinkitat, where he states that "classical architectural fragments" have been found.
