= Luzay of Axum =

Ruler of the Kingdom of Aksum

Luzay

King of Axum
- Reign: Late 1st century BC (1922 list)
- Predecessor: Yoday (List H); Nalke (1922 list)
- Successor: Bazen (1922 list)

Luzay was a king of Aksum who is named on some Ethiopian regnal lists.

== Regnal lists ==
Italian orientalist Carlo Conti Rossini attempted to co-ordinate and compare the large number of different regnal lists from libraries in Ethiopia and Italian Eritrea. The lists were divided into eight groups based on similarities and number of kings, and they were categorized by the letters A to H. Luzay only appears on list H, which is based on three manuscripts. On this list, Luzay is the 25th and last name, preceded by a king named Yoday. No reign dates are provided on this list, and it is notably different the other 7 lists compiled by Rossini.

The official 1922 regnal list, which attempted to combine the names found across all earlier lists, included Luzay as the direct predecessor of Bazen, who is widely accepted on all lists as the Aksumite king who reigned when Jesus Christ was born.

One version of the list written by Prince Regent Tafari Makonnen claims this king reigned for 12 years, from 20 BC to 8 BC, with dates following the Ethiopian calendar. However, two other versions of the 1922 list, written by Heruy Wolde Selassie and Aleka Taye respectively, both state this king instead reigned for 2 years, from 10 BC to 8 BC.

Ethiopian historian Fisseha Yaze Kassa stated this king reigned for 8 years, from 14 BC to 6 BC.

== Bibliography ==
- Edwards, Frederick A. (1918). "The Early Kings of Axum". The Asiatic Review. 14: 438–503.
- Rey, C. F. (1927). In the Country of the Blue Nile. London: Camelot Press. p. 267.
- Selassie, Sergew Hable (1972). Ancient and Medieval Ethiopian History to 1270. Addis Ababa.
