= Zoskales =

Early 2nd century King of Aksum

Zoskales Ζωσκάλης
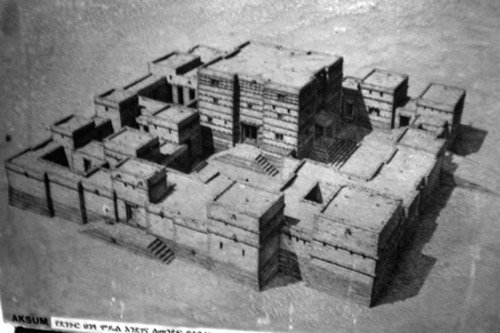
- Residence of Zoskales

Kings of Aksum
- Predecessor: Unknown
- Successor: Unknown

Zoskales (Ancient Greek: Ζωσκάλης) (c. 1st Century) was a King of the Kingdom of Aksum.

== History ==
Approximate area of King Zoskales's kingdom

In the Periplus of the Erythraean Sea, Zoskales is described as the only ruler of the region between Ptolemais Theron on the Sudanese coast and the rest of Barbaria. He was described as a miserly person but otherwise upright and had a Greek education.

At least as early as Henry Salt, some scholars, including Sergew Hable Sellassie and Y. M. Kobishchanov, have identified him with Za Haqala, who is listed in the King Lists of the Kingdom of Aksum as having ruled for 13 years, and who ruled between Za Zalis and Za Dembalé. The identification of Zoskales with Za Haqala is unlikely given the kings list post-dates the periplus by well over a thousand years. G.W.B. Huntingford points out, on the other hand, that there is not enough information to be certain of this identification. He argues instead that Zoskales was a petty king whose power was limited to only Adulis. It was initially assumed that Zoskales was not a king of Aksum because the periplus does not specifically refer to him as a king of Aksum, but instead mentions him in the context of the commerce of Adulis. George Hatke concludes that a realm as vast as Zoskales would likely have been based in the more fertile highlands where Aksum was situated rather than in Adulis. This is because the coastal plain of Eritrea, which is around 40-60 km wide, is mostly unsuitable for agriculture to support a state as extensive as Zoskales realm. Zoskales likely maintained various residences across his realm and regularly stayed at each, a practice common among kings in history, such as medieval Ethiopian monarchs.
