= Za Haqala of Axum =

Early 2nd century King of Aksum

Za Haqala

King of Aksum
- Reign: Mid First Century C.E.
- Predecessor: Za Zalis
- Successor: Za Dembalé

Za Haqala was an ancient King of Axum.

== History ==
The Periplus of the Erythraean Sea mentions Za Haqala as the same person as Zoskales, the King of Adulis in the Second Century C.E. G.W.B. Huntingford points out, on the other hand, that there is not enough information to be certain of this identification. He argues instead that Zoskales was a petty king whose power was limited to only Adulis. Not much though is known about the reign of Za Haqala himself. Za Haqala was known for establishing Axum from a Kingdom to an Empire. He was the successor of Za Zalis and was succeeded by Za Dembalé.
