= Bazen of Axum =

Early 1st century King of Aksum

Bazen

King of Aksum
- Reign: 1 B.C.–16 A.D.
- Predecessor: Luzay
- Successor: Za Zalis (?)
- Issue: Za Zalis (?)
- Religion: Paganism

Bazen was a king of Axum who reigned beginning in 8 B.C. according to various Ethiopian regnal lists in E.C. and around 1 B.C.–16 A.D in G.E.

== History ==
Ethiopian regnal lists largely agree that Bazen's reign began eight years before the birth of Christ. Oral lists recorded by James Bruce and Henry Salt claim Bazen reigned for sixteen years. A manuscript held in the British Museum also records a 16-year reign for this king. However, a different written list quoted by Pedro Páez claimed this king reigned for 17 years instead. The 1922 regnal list quoted by Prince Regent Tafari Makannon claims this king reigned for 17 years from 8 B.C. to 9 A.D., with dates following the Ethiopian calendar. Ethiopian historian Fisseha Yaze Kassa stated this king reigned for 6 years.

Egyptologist Henry Salt claimed he saw an ancient inscription on a stone in a church in Axum stating "This is the sepulchral stone of Bazen". He did however claim that this was the name of several Abyssinian kings, so he may not have been referring to this specific king.

== In Christianity ==
The Ethiopian Orthodox Tewahedo Church has an ancient tradition identifying Bazen of Axum with Balthazar, one of the Biblical Magi.
