= Kubar =

Former capital of the Kingdom of Aksum

Kubar also known as Ku'bar or Kuber is the name of the last capital of the Kingdom of Aksum and the residence of the Ethiopian ruler mentioned in several medieval Arabic sources.

== History ==
It is first mentioned by the 10th century geographer al-Ya'qubi (fl. 872 A.D.), who gives the following short but valuable description;

"It is a spacious, important country. The capital of the kingdom is Kubar. The Arabs still go to it for trading and they (the Ethiopians) have mighty cities, and their coast is Dahlak. As to the kings in the land of al-Habasha they are under the control of the great king (the Najashi) to whom they show obedience and pay taxes. The Najashi is of the Jacobite Christian faith."

The historian al-Masudi refers to Kubar in his The Meadows of Gold, describing it as a "great city" and the "residence of the Najashi". In a similar context, in his Akhbar al-zaman, the same al-Masudi calls the Ethiopian capital "Kufar" or "Kafer". In the Arabic works of the 13th and 14th century, Kubar is still mentioned as being the capital of Ethiopia. Arab historian Ibn Khaldun refers to it in his Kitab al-ibar.

== Location ==
Because of the lack of archeological data, hypothesis about the location of Kubar varies to a certain extent. Carlo Conti Rossini initially believed that it was located in modern Ankober, but discarded that theory based on chronological and linguistic grounds. Later, he proposed that Kubar was a corrupted spelling of the name Aksum. This theory was favored by J. Spencer Trimingham, Manfred Kropp and Ewald Wagner. However, Taddesse Tamrat locates Kubar in southern Tigray or in Angot, whereas Enno Littmann believed that it was located in the province of Begemder.
