= Kingdom of Aksum =

Polity in Africa and Arabia before 960

Kingdom of Aksum መንግሥተ አክሱም (Ge'ez) 𐩱𐩫𐩪𐩣 (Sabaean) Βασιλεία τῶν Ἀξωμιτῶν (Ancient Greek)
- 1st century – 960 AD
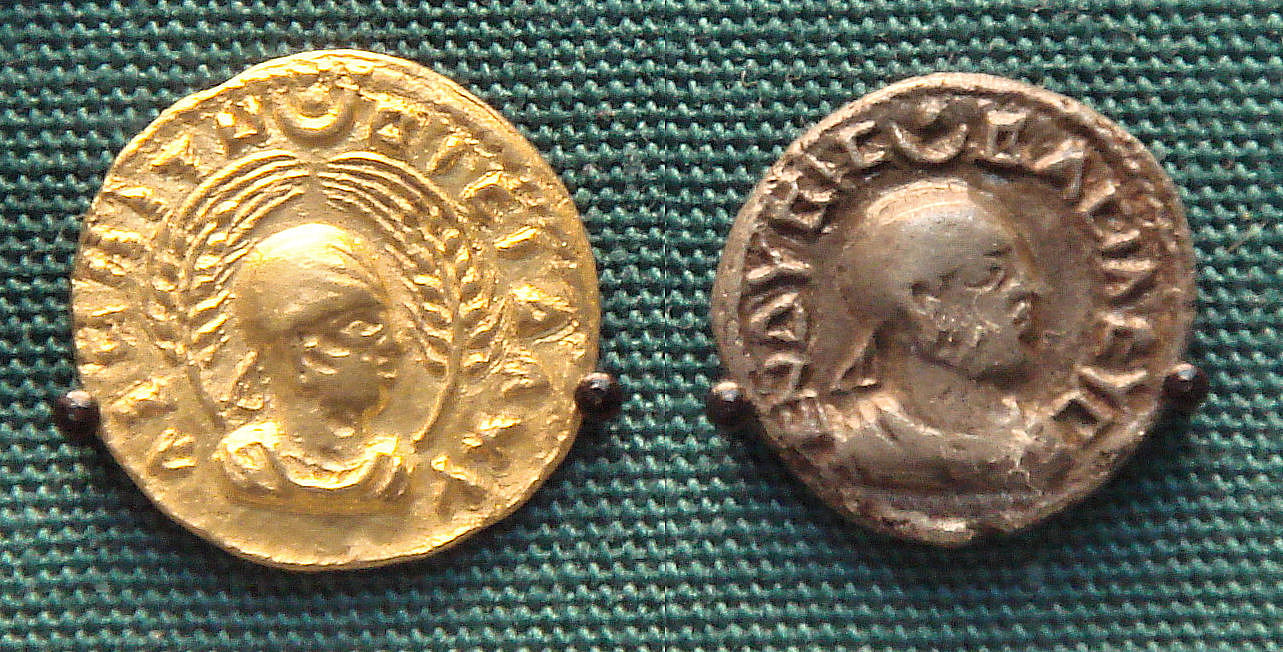
- Aksumite currency depicting King Endybis

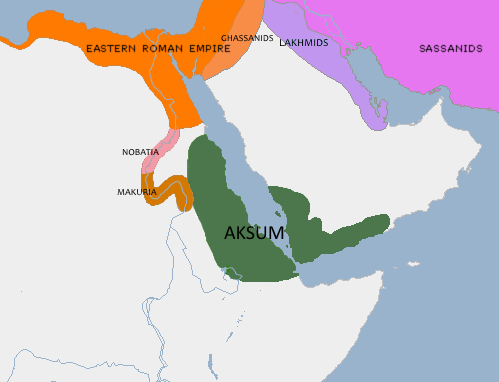
- The Kingdom of Aksum c. 6th century after the Aksumite invasion of Himyar
- Capital: Axum; Kubar (after c. 800)
- Common languages: Geʽez; Sabaic; Koine Greek; (from 1st century); Various (Note: Latin, Arabic, Coptic, Persian, Nubian, and other languages.)
- Religion: Christianity (Nicene and Miaphysite Christianity; official after mid-4th century); Aksumite polytheism (before 350); Ancient Semitic religion (before 350)
- Demonyms: Aksumite, Ethiopian, Abyssinian
- Government: Monarchy
- Negus / Negusa Nagast
  - c. 1st century: Bazen of Axum (first known) Ethiopis (according to tradition)
  - 917 or 940-960: Dil Na'od (last)
- Historical era: Classical antiquity to Early Middle Ages
  - Established: 1st century
  - Early South Arabian involvement: 3rd century
  - King Ezana's conversion to Christianity: 325 or 328
  - King Ezana's conquest of the Kingdom of Kush: 330
  - Aksumite invasion of Himyar: 518–525
  - Year of the Elephant: 570
  - Aksumite–Persian wars: 570–578
  - First Hijra: 613–615
  - Early Muslim conquests: 7th century
  - The Umayyed invasion of Dahlak and Ethiopian Coasts and establishment of the Sultanate of Dahlak: 7th–8th century
  - Collapse: 960 AD

Area
- 350: 1,250,000 km^{2} (480,000 sq mi)
- 525: 2,500,000 km^{2} (970,000 sq mi)
- Currency: Aksumite currency
Preceded by	Succeeded by
Dʿmt	Zagwe dynasty
- Today part of: Eritrea; Ethiopia; Sudan; Djibouti; Yemen; Saudi Arabia

The Kingdom of Aksum, (Note: Ge'ez: አክሱም, romanized: ʾÄksum; Sabaean: 𐩱𐩫𐩪𐩣, romanized: ʾkšm; Ancient Greek: Ἀξωμίτης, romanized: Axōmítēs) (Note: also romanized as the Kingdom of Axum) or the Aksumite Empire, (Note: also romanized as the Axumite Empire) was a kingdom in the Horn of Africa and South Arabia from classical antiquity to the Middle Ages, based in what is now Eritrea and Northern Ethiopia, and spanning present-day Djibouti, Sudan, Yemen and Saudi Arabia. Emerging from the earlier Dʿmt civilization, the kingdom was founded in the 1st century. The city of Axum served as the kingdom's capital.

The Kingdom of Aksum was considered one of the four great powers of the 3rd century by Mani, the founder of Manichaeism, alongside Persia, Rome, and China. Aksum continued to expand under the reign of Gedara (c. 200–230), who was the first king to be involved in South Arabian affairs. His reign resulted in the control of much of western Yemen, such as the Tihama, Najran, al-Ma'afir, Zafar (until c. 230), and parts of Hashid territory around Hamir in the northern highlands until a joint Himyarite-Sabean alliance pushed them out. Aksum-Himyar conflicts persisted throughout the 3rd century. During the reign of Endybis (270–310), Aksum began minting coins that have been excavated as far away as Caesarea and southern India.

As the kingdom became a major power on the trade route between Rome and India and gained a monopoly of Indian Ocean trade, it entered the Greco-Roman cultural sphere. Due to its ties with the Greco-Roman world, Aksum adopted Christianity as its state religion in the mid 4th century under Ezana (320s – c. 360). Following their Christianization, the Aksumites ceased construction of steles. The kingdom continued to expand throughout late antiquity, conquering Meroë under Ezana in 330 for a short period of time and inheriting from it the Greek exonym "Ethiopia".

Aksumite dominance in the Red Sea culminated during the reign of Kaleb of Axum (514–542), who, at the behest of the Byzantine emperor Justin I, invaded the Himyarite Kingdom in Yemen to end the persecution of Christians perpetrated by the Jewish king Dhu Nuwas. With the annexation of Himyar, the Kingdom of Aksum reached its largest territorial extent, spanning around 2,500,000 km^{2} (970,000 sq mi). However, the territory was lost in the Aksumite–Persian wars. Aksum held on to Southern Arabia from 520 until 525 when Sumyafa Ashwa was deposed by Abraha.

The kingdom's slow decline had begun by the 7th century, at which point currency ceased to be minted. The Persian (and later Muslim) presence in the Red Sea, as well as the past few centuries seeing the decline in power of the Roman Empire (which was a major trade partner), caused Aksum to suffer economically, and the population of the city of Axum shrank. Alongside environmental and internal factors, this has been suggested as the reason for its decline. Aksum's final three centuries are considered a dark age, and the kingdom collapsed under uncertain circumstances around 960. Despite its position as one of the foremost empires of late antiquity, the Kingdom of Aksum fell into obscurity as Ethiopia remained isolated throughout the Late Middle Ages.

== Etymology ==
Carlo Conti Rossini believed that the word Aksum derives from a Semitic root, and means 'a green and dense garden' or 'full of grass'.

Due to limited geographical knowledge many Byzantine texts from seventh and early eight century wrongly classified Ethiopia being in "India", which lead to the Kingdom also being called Kingdom of the Aksumite Indians.

== History ==
=== Early history ===
Before the establishment of Axum, Eritrea and the Tigray Plateau of northern Ethiopia were home to a kingdom known as dʿmt. Archaeological evidence indicates that the kingdom was influenced by Sheba (now Yemen). Scholarly consensus had previously held that the Sabaeans (the people of Sheba) were the founders of 'Semitic' civilization in Ethiopia, though this view has now been refuted, and their influence is considered minor. (Note: According to Munro-Hay, "The arrival of Sabaean influences does not represent the beginning of Ethiopian civilisation.... Semiticized Agaw peoples are thought to have migrated from south-eastern Eritrea possibly as early as 2000 BC, bringing their 'proto-Ethiopic' language, ancestor of Geʽez and the other Ethiopian Semitic languages, with them; and these and other groups had already developed specific cultural and linguistic identities by the time any Sabaean influences arrived.") The Sabaean presence likely lasted only for a matter of decades, but their influence on later Aksumite civilization included the adoption of Ancient South Arabian script, which developed into Geʽez script, and Ancient Semitic religion.

The early centuries of Aksum's development, during which it transitioned from a modest regional center to a significant power, remain largely obscure. Archaeological research at Pre-Aksumite sites, such as Mezber and Ona Adi, has explored the development of these early societies and their relationship to later Aksumite settlements. Stone Age artifacts have been unearthed at Gobedra, two kilometres west of Aksum. Archaeological excavations on the tell of Betä Giyorgis northwest of Aksum validate the pre-Aksumite roots of a settlement in the vicinity of Aksum, dating back to approximately the seventh to fourth centuries BCE. Further evidence from excavations in the Stele Park at the heart of Aksum corroborates continuous activity in the area from the beginning of the Common Era. Two hills and two streams lie on the east and west expanses of the city of Aksum, perhaps providing the initial impetus for settling this area.

Archeological evidence suggests that the Aksumite polity arose between 150 BCE and 150 CE. Small-scale kingdoms denoted by very large nucleated communities with one or more elite residences appear to have existed in the early period of the kingdom of Aksum, and here Stuart Munro-Hay concludes,

Quite probably, the kingdom was a confederacy, one of which was led by a district-level king who commanded the allegiance of other petty kings within the Axumite realm. The ruler of the Axumite kingdom was thus 'king of kings' — a title often found in inscriptions of this period. There is no evidence that a single royal lineage has yet emerged, and it is quite possible that at the death of a king of kings, a new one would be selected from among all the kings in the confederacy, rather than through some principle of primogeniture."

=== Rise of Aksum ===
The first historical mention of Axum comes from the Periplus of the Erythraean Sea, a trading guide which likely dates to the mid-first century AD. Axum is mentioned alongside Adulis and Ptolemais of the Hunts as lying within the realm of Zoskales. The area is described as primarily producing ivory, as well as tortoise shells. It is evident from the Periplus that, even at this early stage of its history, Axum played a role in the transcontinental trade route between Rome and India.

The Aksumite control over Adulis enabled the exchange of Ethiopian products for imports. Both Pliny the Elder and the Periplus of the Erythraean Sea refer to this port, situated three days away from the initial ivory market at Coloe, itself five days distant from Aksum. This trade across the Red Sea, spanning from the Roman Empire in the north to India and Ceylon in the east, played a crucial role in Aksum's prosperity. The city thrived by exporting goods such as ivory, tortoiseshell, and rhinoceros horn. Pliny also mentioned additional items like hippopotamus hide, monkeys, and slaves. During the second century AD, Ptolemy's geographer referred to Aksum as a powerful kingdom. Both archaeological findings and textual evidence suggest that during this period, a centralized regional polity had emerged in the Aksumite area, characterized by defined social stratification. By the beginning of the fourth century AD, the Aksumite state had become well-established, featuring urban centers, an official currency with coinage struck in gold, silver, and copper, an intensive agricultural system, and an organized military.

Around 200 AD, Aksumite ambitions had expanded to Southern Arabia, where Aksum appears to have established itself in al-Maafer and engaged in conflicts with Saba and Himyar at various points, forming different alliances with chief kingdoms and tribes. During the early part of the third century, the kings GDRT and ʽDBH dispatched military expeditions to the region. Inscriptions from local Arabian dynasties refer to these rulers with the title "nagasi of Aksum and Habashat," and a metal object discovered in eastern Tigray also mentions a certain "GDR negus of Aksum." Later in the century, the mlky hhst dtwns wzqrns (kings of Habashat DTWNS and ZQRNS) are also mentioned fighting in Arabia. According to a Greek inscription in Eritrea known as the Monumentum Adulitanum recorded by Cosmas Indicopleustes, in around the mid to late third century (possibly circa 240 to circa 260), the Aksumites, led by an anonymous king, achieved significant territorial expansion in the Ethiopian Highlands and the Arabian Peninsula, with their influence extending as far as Lake Tana and the borders of Egypt.

GDRT (Note: Geez inscription names him simply as GDR. GDRT of the South Arabian inscriptions is likely the same king as GDR, though the identification is not certain) is also the author of the oldest surviving royal inscription in Geez, found at ʿAddi Gälämo (RIÉ 180), the meaning of which remains debated but has been plausibly read as recording a royal dedication of a sceptre to two sanctuaries. In South Arabian texts GDRT is referred to by the title mlk hbšt wýksmn, meaning "king of Ethiopia and the Aksumites", which is the earliest attestation of that dual formulation. By around 200 AD he had entered South Arabian politics as an ally of the Sabaean king ʿAlhan Nahfan, and an inscription at the Sabaean royal palace records a formal friendship pact between the two rulers. That alliance did not last: during the reign of ʿAlhan's son ŠaʿirumYawtar (ca. 210–230 AD), Sabaean and Aksumite interests came into conflict, and though GDRT succeeded in controlling vast stretches of western Yemen during that period, including the Tihama, Najran, Zafar, al-Maʿafir, and parts of the Hašid highlands near Hamir, Sabaean pressure eventually pushed Aksumite forces back. His memory survived in the traditional Ethiopian king lists under the variants Gédur and Zägdur.

By the end of the third century AD, Aksum had gained recognition by the prophet Mani in the Kephalaia, as one of the four great powers of the world alongside Rome, Persia, and China. As the political influence of Aksum expanded, so did the grandeur of its monuments. Excavations by archaeological expeditions revealed early use of stelae, evolving from plain and rough markers to some of the largest monuments in Africa. The granite steles in the main cemetery, housing Aksumite royal tombs, were transformed from plain to carefully dressed granite, eventually carved to resemble multi-storey towers in a distinctive architectural style. Aksumite architecture featured massive dressed granite blocks, smaller uncut stones for walling, mud mortar, bricks for vaulting and arches, and a visible wooden framework, known as "monkey-heads" or square corner extrusions. Walls inclined inwards and incorporated several recessed bays for added strength. Aksum and other cities, such as Adulis and Matara, boasted substantial "palace" buildings employing this architectural style. In the early sixth century, Cosmas Indicopleustes described his visit to Aksum, mentioning the four-towered palace of the Aksumite king, adorned with bronze statues of unicorns. Aksum also featured rows of monumental granite thrones, likely bearing metal statues dedicated to pre-Christian deities. These thrones incorporated large panels at the sides and back with inscriptions, attributed to Ousanas, Ezana, Kaleb, and his son Wazeba, serving as victory monuments documenting the wars of these kings.

King Ezana became the first Christian ruler of Aksum in the fourth century. Ezana's coins and inscriptions make the change from pre-Christian imagery to Christian symbolism around 340. The conversion to Christianity was one of the most revolutionary events in the history of Ethiopia as it gave Aksum a cultural link with the Mediterranean. Aksum gained a political link with the Byzantine Empire, which regarded itself as the protector of Christendom. Three inscriptions on the Ezana Stone document the conversion of King Ezana to Christianity and two of his military expeditions against neighboring areas, one inscribed in Greek and the other in Ge'ez. The two expeditions refers to two distinct campaigns, one against the "Noba", and the other against the Beja. According to the inscription, the Noba were settled somewhere around the Nile and Atbara confluence, where they seemed to have taken over much of the Kingdom of Kush. Yet they did not drive the Kushites away from their heartland since the inscription states that the Aksumites fought them at the junction of the two rivers. Also mentioned in the inscription are the mysterious "red Noba" against whom an expedition was carried out. This people seems to be settled further north and may be identical with the "other Nobades" mentioned in the inscription of the Nubian king Silko carved on the wall of the Temple of Kalabsha.

Ezana bore the clan name béýése Halen ("man of Halen"), recorded in both his inscriptions and on coins in the Greek form bisi Alene. His inscriptions document four separate military campaigns, three of them conducted while he was still pagan, against the Bega, the Agwézat, and a people called the Afan. The fourth, against the Noba and Kasu, was carried out after his conversion and opens with a Christian formula. During the Bega campaign his brother Sazanas served as one of the army commanders, and in Ezana's later years Sazanas was elevated to co-regent. A letter of the Roman Emperor Constantius II, dated to 356/57 AD and preserved in a work by Athanasius of Alexandria, is addressed to "the tyrannoi Aizanas and Sazanas," indicating that the Romans recognized the joint rule and were attempting to bring Aksumite church affairs under imperial influence by removing Frumentius, an effort that came to nothing.

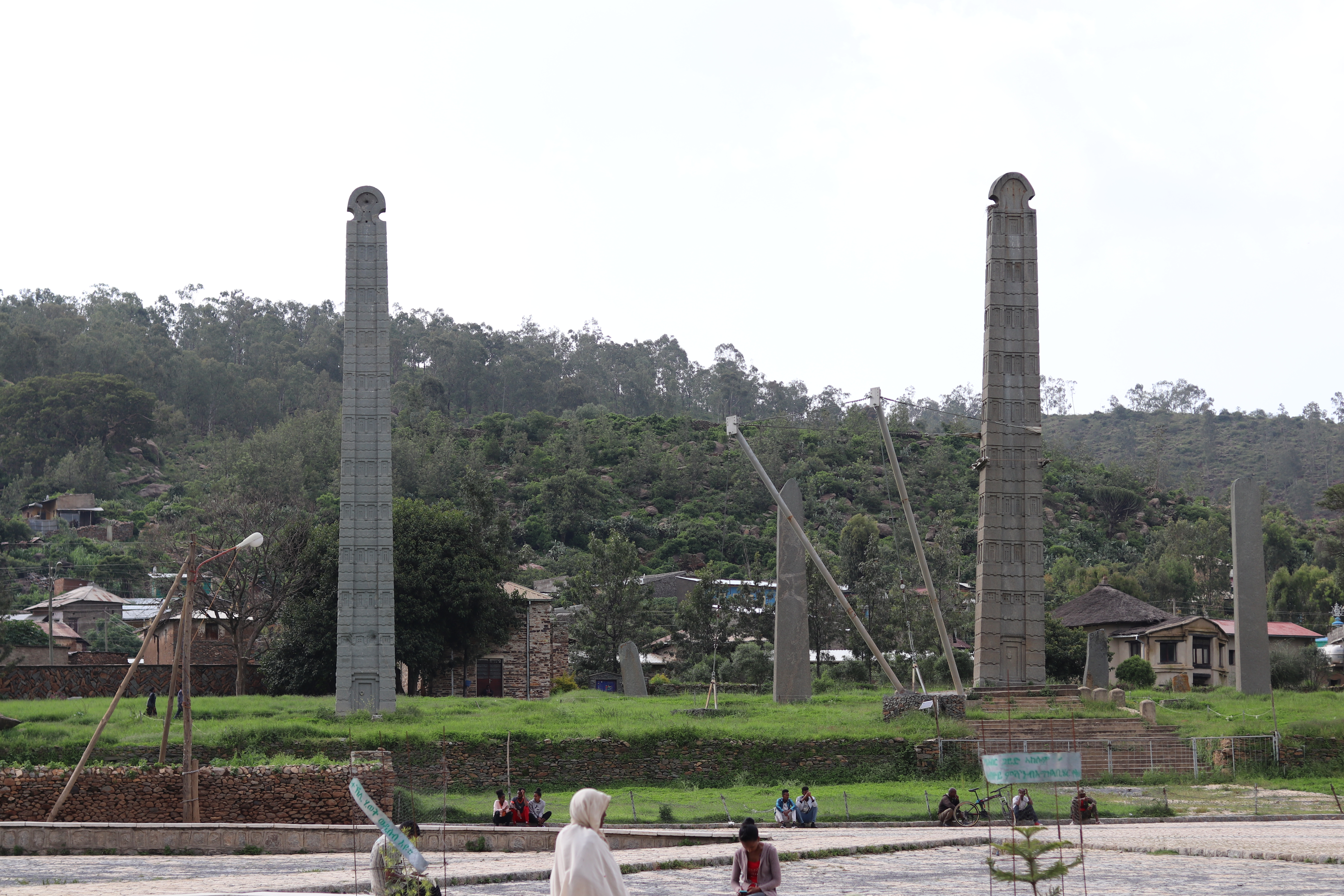
The Obelisk of Axum

King Kaleb sent an expedition against the Jewish Himyarite king Dhu Nuwas, who was persecuting the Christian community in Yemen. Kaleb gained widespread acclaim in his era as the conqueror of Yemen. He expanded his royal title to include king of Hadramawt in southeastern Yemen, as well as the coastal plain and highland of Yemen, along with "all their Arabs", highlighting the extensive influence of Aksum across the Red Sea into Arabia. Dhu Nuwas was deposed and killed and Kaleb appointed an Arab viceroy named Esimiphaios ("Sumuafa Ashawa"), but his rule was short-lived as he was ousted in a coup led by an Aksumite named Abraha after five years. Kaleb sent two expeditions against Abraha, but both were decisively defeated. According to Procopius, following Aksum's unsuccessful attempts to remove him, Abraha continued to govern Yemen through a tribute arrangement with the king of Aksum.

After Abraha's death, his son Masruq Abraha continued the Aksumite vice-royalty in Yemen, resuming payment of tribute to Aksum. However, his half-brother Ma'd-Karib revolted. Ma'd-Karib first sought help from the Roman Emperor Justinian the Great, but having been denied, he decided to ally with the Sassanid Persian Emperor Khosrow I, triggering the Aksumite–Persian wars. Khosrow I sent a small fleet and army under the commander Vahrez to depose the king of Yemen. The war culminated with the Siege of Sana'a, capital of Aksumite Yemen. After its fall in 570 and Masruq's death, Ma'd-Karib's son, Saif, was put on the throne. In 575, the war resumed again, after Saif was killed by the Aksumites. The Persian general Vahrez led another army of 8,000, ending Axum rule in Yemen and becoming the hereditary governor of Yemen. According to Stuart Munro-Hay, these wars may have been Aksum's swan song as a great power, with an overall weakening of Aksumite authority and over-expenditure in money and manpower.

=== Decline ===
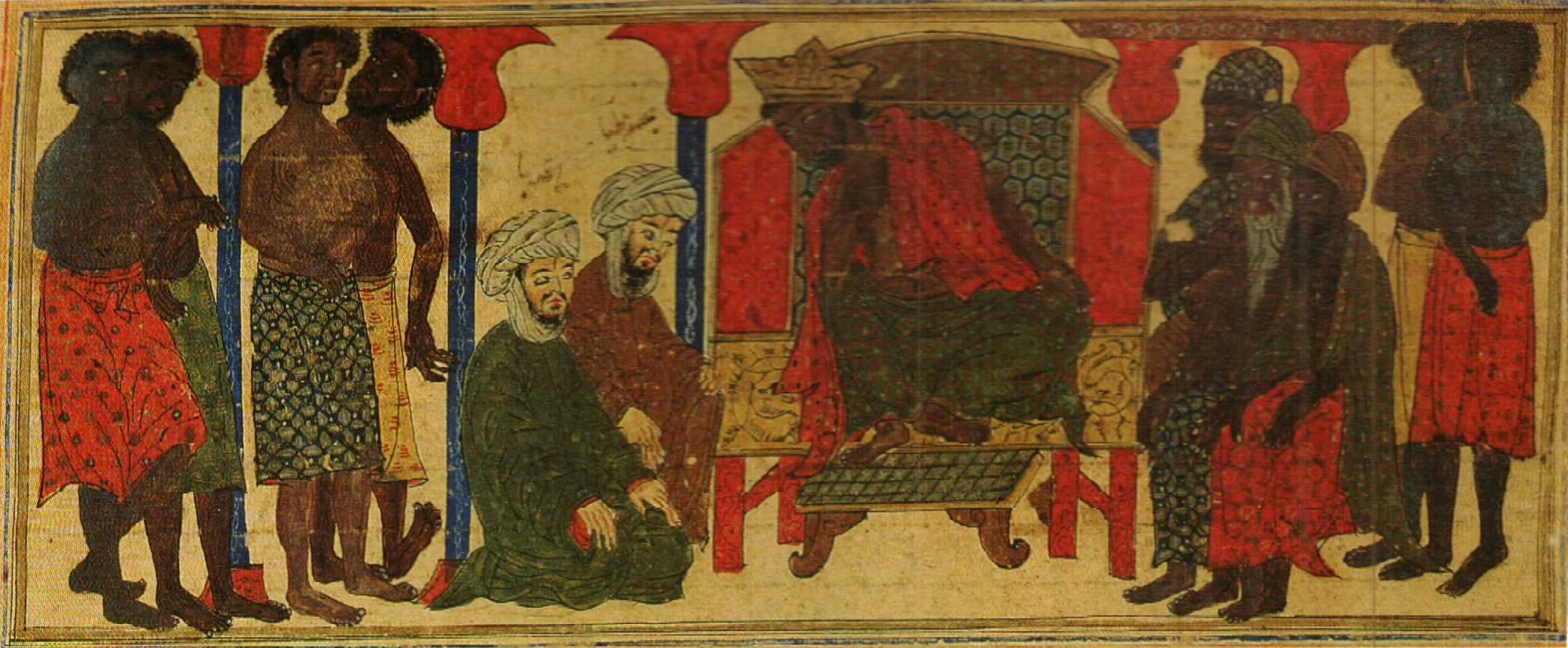
14th century Islamic portrayal of the First Hijrah

Aksumite trade in the Red Sea likely suffered due to the Persian conquests in Egypt and Syria, followed by the defeats in Yemen. However, a more enduring impact occurred with the rise of Islam in the early seventh century and the expansion of the Rashidun Caliphate. Axum initially had good relations with its Islamic neighbours. In 615, for example, early Muslims from Mecca fleeing Qurayshi persecution traveled to Axum and were given refuge; this journey is known in Islamic history as the First Hijrah. In 630, Muhammad sent a naval expedition against suspected Abyssinian pirates, the Expedition of Alqammah bin Mujazziz. Trade with the Roman and Byzantine world came to a halt as the Arabs seized the eastern Roman provinces. Consequently, Aksum experienced a decline in prosperity due to increased isolation and eventually ceased production of coins in the early eighth century. The decline of Aksum contributed to the emergence of the nearby Islamic-influenced Harla Kingdom.

The Islamic conquests were not solely responsible for the decline of Aksum. Another reason for the decline was the expansion of the Beja nomads. Due to the poverty of their country, many of them began to migrate into the northern Ethiopian plateau. At the end of the seventh century, a strong Beja tribe known as the Zanafaj entered the Eritrean plateau through the valley of Gash-Barka. They overran and pillaged much of the Eritrean highlands as Aksum could no longer maintain its sovereignty over the frontier. As a result, the connection to the Red Sea ports was lost.

Around this same time, the Aksumite population was forced to go farther inland to the highlands for protection, abandoning Aksum as the capital. Arab writers of the time continued to describe Ethiopia (no longer referred to as Aksum) as an extensive and powerful state, though they had lost control of most of the coast and their tributaries. While land was lost in the north, it was gained in the south, and though Ethiopia was no longer an economic power, it still attracted Arab merchants. The capital was then moved south to a new location called Kubar. The Arab writer Ya'qubi was the first to describe the new Aksumite capital. The capital was probably located in southern Tigray or Angot; however, the exact location of this city is currently unknown. Famine is noted in Ethiopia in the ninth century. The Coptic patriarchs James (819–830) and Joseph (830–849) of Alexandria attribute Ethiopia's condition to war, plague, and inadequate rains. Under the reign of Degna Djan, during the ninth century, the empire kept expanding south, undertaking missionary activities south of Angot.

==== Gudit's invasion ====
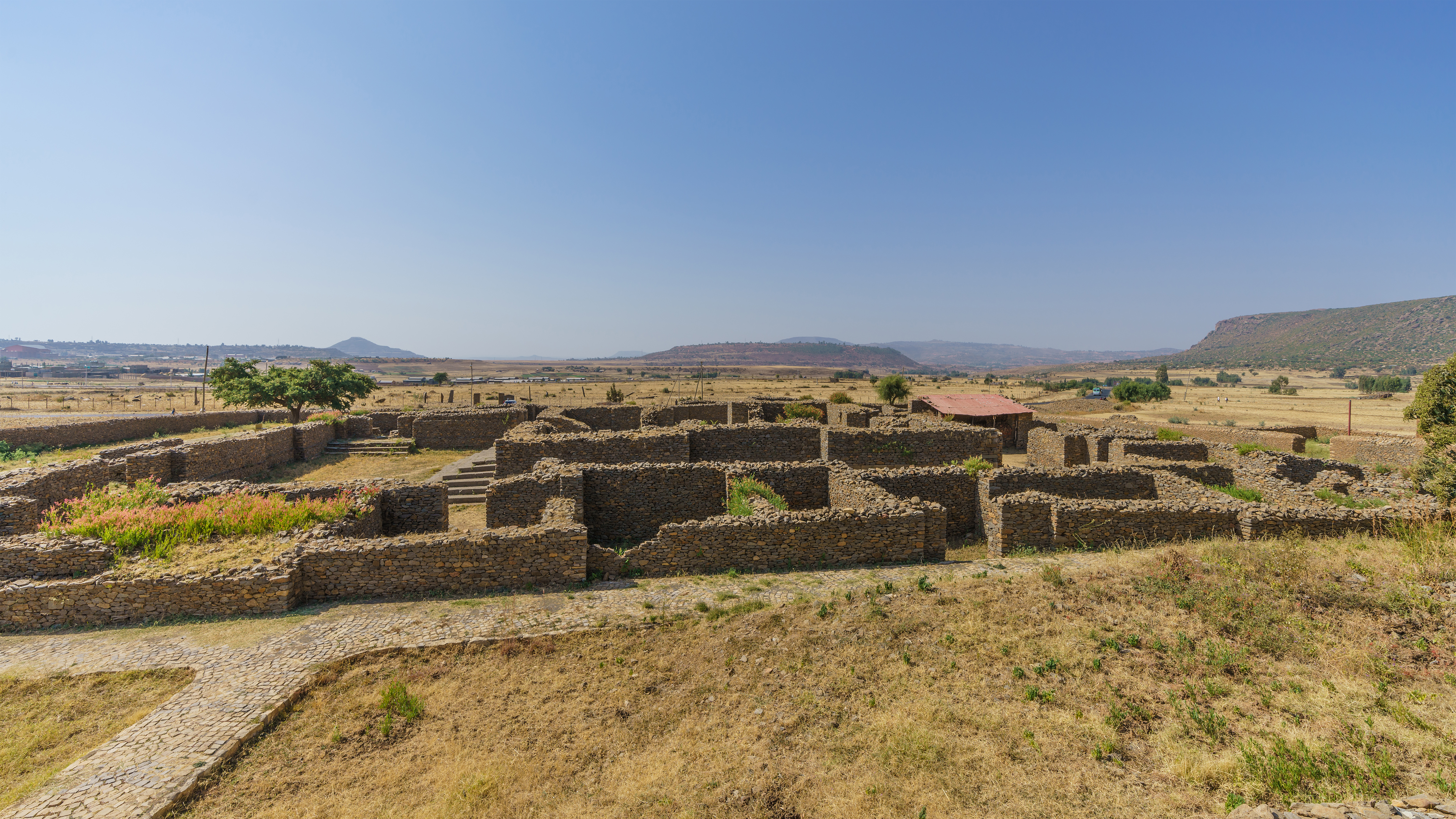
Ruins of Dungur in Aksum, Tigray Region, Ethiopia

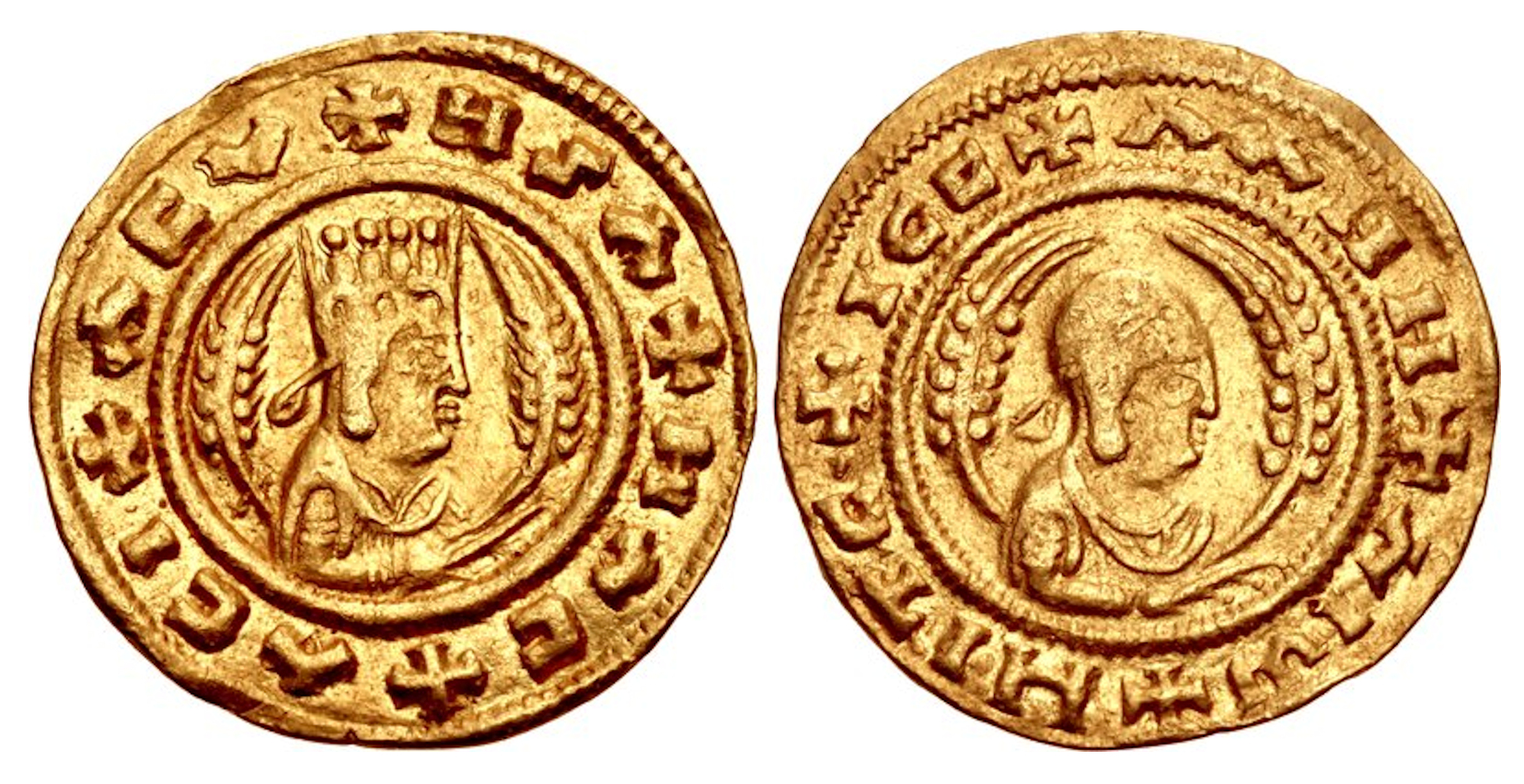
Coins of King Ezana, 330–360 AD.

Local history holds that, around 960, a queen known as Gudit (also Yodit or Ésato) conquered Aksum, sacking the city and destroying churches and literature. While there is evidence of churches being burned and an invasion around this time, her existence has been questioned by some modern scholarship. Specifically, the Encyclopaedia Aethiopica, which cautions that the story "exists in several versions" and that her identity, origin, and religion remain disputed among scholars. The Arabic writer Ibn Hawqal, writing around 980, records that the Queen of Abyssinia had been ruling for thirty years and had killed the king or hadani, who is "more than likely identical with Gudit." The legend appears to have been constructed around a kernel of truth regarding a late 10th-century queen of the Banu l-Ham(u)wiya who came from the south, perhaps from Damot or Bali.

The common description of Gudit as Jewish derives largely from the Scottish traveller James Bruce, whose account the Encyclopaedia Aethiopica credits as "most responsible for its dissemination into both scholarly and popular writings", while Carlo Conti Rossini demonstrated that "significant reasons exist for rejecting the queen's alleged Jewishness."

She was said to have been succeeded by Dagna-Jan, whose throne name was Anbasa Wudem. Her reign was marked by the displacement of the Aksumite population into the south. According to one Ethiopian traditional account, she reigned for forty years and her dynasty was eventually overthrown by Mara Tekla Haymanot in 1137 C.E., who ushered in the formation of the Zagwe dynasty by bearing children with a descendant of the last Aksumite emperor, Dil Na'od.

After a short Dark Age, the Aksumite Empire was succeeded by the Zagwe dynasty in the eleventh or twelfth century (most likely around 1137), although limited in size and scope. However, Yekuno Amlak, who killed the last Zagwe king and founded the modern Solomonic dynasty around 1270 traced his ancestry and his right to rule from the last emperor of Aksum, Dil Na'od. It should be mentioned that the end of the Aksumite Empire didn't mean the end of Aksumite culture and traditions; for example, the architecture of the Zagwe dynasty at Lalibela and Yemrehana Krestos Church shows heavy Aksumite influence.

== Society ==
The Aksumite population mainly consisted of Semitic-speaking groups, one of these groups were the Agʿazian or the speakers of Geʽez. The commentator of the Adulis inscription identifies them as the main inhabitants of Aksum and its surroundings. The Cushitic-speaking Agaw people were also known to have lived within the kingdom, as Cosmas Indicopleustes notes that a "governor of Agau", was entrusted by King Kaleb of Axum with the protection of the vital long-distance caravan routes from the south, suggesting that they lived within the southern frontier of the Aksumite kingdom. Aksum also had a sizeable Greek population, which resided in the cities of Ptolemais Theron and Adulis. Nilotic groups also inhabited Aksum, as inscriptions from the time of Ezana note the "Barya", an animist tribe who lived in the western part of the empire, believed to be the Naras.

Aksumite settlements were distributed across a significant portion of the highlands in the northern Horn of Africa, with the majority located in northeastern Tigray, Ethiopia, as well as the Akele Guzai and Seraye regions of Eritrea. Despite the concentration in these areas, some Aksumite settlements such as Mifsas Bahri are located as far as Ofla. In addition to the highlands, sites from the Aksumite period were discovered along the Red Sea coast of Eritrea, near the Gulf of Zula. Numerous Aksumite settlements were strategically positioned along an axis that traversed from Aksum to the Gulf of Zula, forming a route connecting the Aksumite capital in the highlands to the principal Aksumite port of Adulis on the Red Sea. Along this route, two of the largest Aksumite-era settlements, Matara and Qohaito, were situated in the Eritrean highlands. The concertation of these Aksumite ancient settlements suggests high population density in the highlands of Tigray and central Eritrea. The southern regions of the Aksumite polity are little known. However, in the mountains of Lasta and Wollo, archeological surveys appear to have located sites with Aksumite affinities, particularly near Mount Abuna Yosef.

A complex agricultural system in the Aksumite area, which involved irrigation, dam construction, terracing, and plough-farming, played a crucial role in sustaining both urban and rural populations. Aksumite farmers cultivated a variety of cereal crops with origins from both Africa and the Near East. These crops included teff, finger millet, sorghum, emmer wheat, bread wheat, hulled barley, and oats. In addition to cereal crops, Aksumite farmers also grew linseed, cotton, grapes, and legumes of Near Eastern origin such as lentils, fava beans, chickpeas, common peas, and grass peas. Other important crops included the African oil crop, Guizotia abyssinica, as well as gourds and cress. This diverse range of crops, combined with the herding of domesticated cattle, sheep, and goats, contributed to the creation of a highly productive indigenous agropastoral food-producing tradition. This tradition played an integral role in the development of the Aksumite economy and the consolidation of state power.

== Culture ==
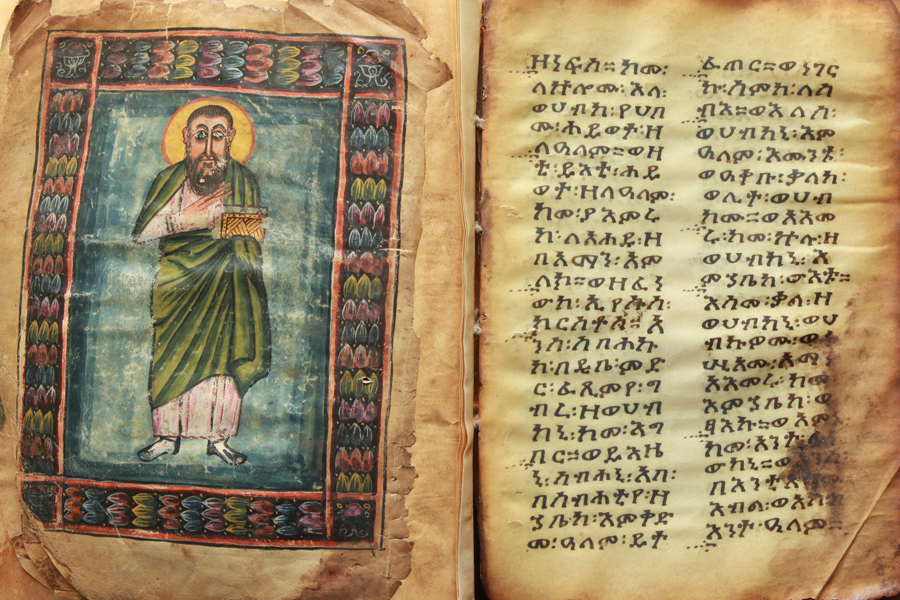
Geʽez script in the Garima Gospels

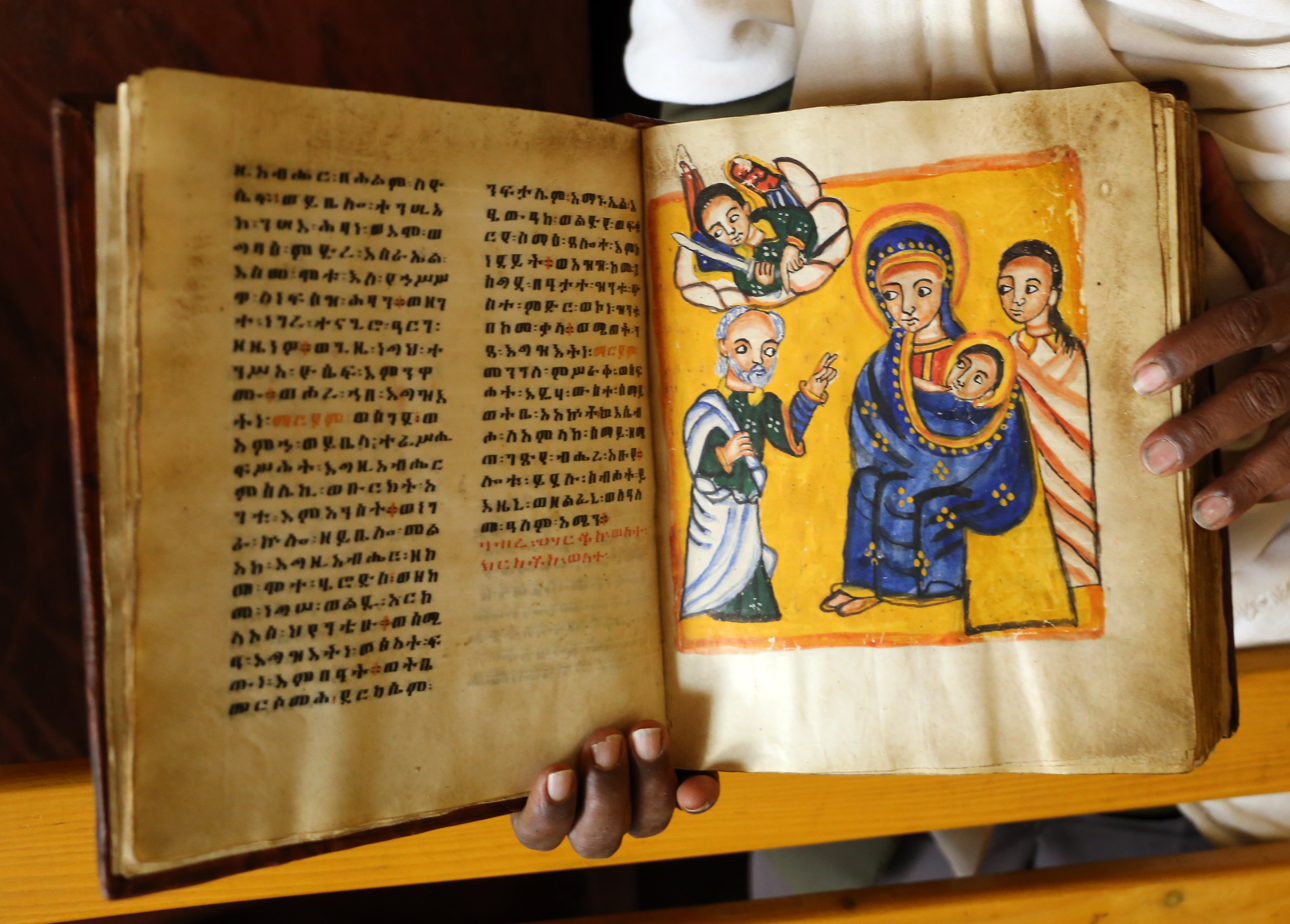
An illuminated manuscript of Holy Mother Mary

The Empire of Aksum is notable for a number of achievements, such as its own alphabet, the Geʽez script, which was eventually modified to include vowels, becoming an abugida. Furthermore, in the early times of the empire, around 1700 years ago, giant obelisks to mark emperors' (and nobles') tombs (underground grave chambers) were constructed, the most famous of which is the Obelisk of Aksum.

Under Emperor Ezana, Aksum adopted Coptic Christianity in place of its former polytheistic and Judaic religions around 325. The Axumite Coptic Church gave rise to the present day Ethiopian Orthodox Tewahedo Church (only granted autonomy from the Coptic Church in 1959) and Eritrean Orthodox Tewahdo Church (granted autonomy from the Ethiopian Orthodox church in 1993). Since the schism with Orthodoxy following the Council of Chalcedon (451), it has been an important Miaphysite church, and its scriptures and liturgy continue to be in Geʽez.

=== Language ===
Greek became the official and literary language of the Axumite state, coming from the influence of the significant Ethiopian Greek communities established in Axum, the port of Adulis, Ptolemais Theron, and other cities in the region during Ptolemaic times. Greek was used in the state's administration, international diplomacy, and trade; it can be widely seen in coinage and inscriptions.

Geʿez, the language of Agʿazi, was spoken alongside Greek in the court of Aksum. Although during the early kingdom, Geʿez was a spoken language, it has attestations written in the Old South Arabian language Sabaic. In the fourth century, Ezana of Axum promoted the Geʽez script and made Geʽez an official state language alongside Greek; by the sixth century literary translations into Geʿez were common. After the seventh century's Muslim conquests in the Middle East and North Africa, which effectively isolated Axum from the Greco-Roman world, Geʿez replaced Greek entirely.

=== Literature ===
Early on in the Christian period, several texts began to be translated into Ge'ez in the Kingdom of Aksum for religious purposes. The most famous example is represented by the Garima Gospels, a set of manuscripts containing all four Gospels translated into Ethiopic dating between the fourth and sixth centuries. Citations of the Bible occur in several Aksumite inscriptions that have been found in South Arabia. Dating to roughly the same time period, the Aksumite Collection is a multi-text manuscript dating to the 13th century, at the latest, but containing a large number of documents which must have been translated into Ge'ez between the fourth and sixth centuries, covering subjects including liturgy, canon law, historiography, letters and treatises, etc.

Other translations include the entire Greek Bible, parabiblical texts (including the Book of Enoch, Book of Jubilees, 4 Baruch, and the Ascension of Isaiah), and other theological texts like the Qerallos. Native Ethiopic texts from this period are less certain, though it was a period active with translations from Greek texts. The reception or translation of Syriac literature during the Aksumite age is still unattested. In recent decades, the known corpus of Aksumite literature has grown substantially.

=== Religion ===
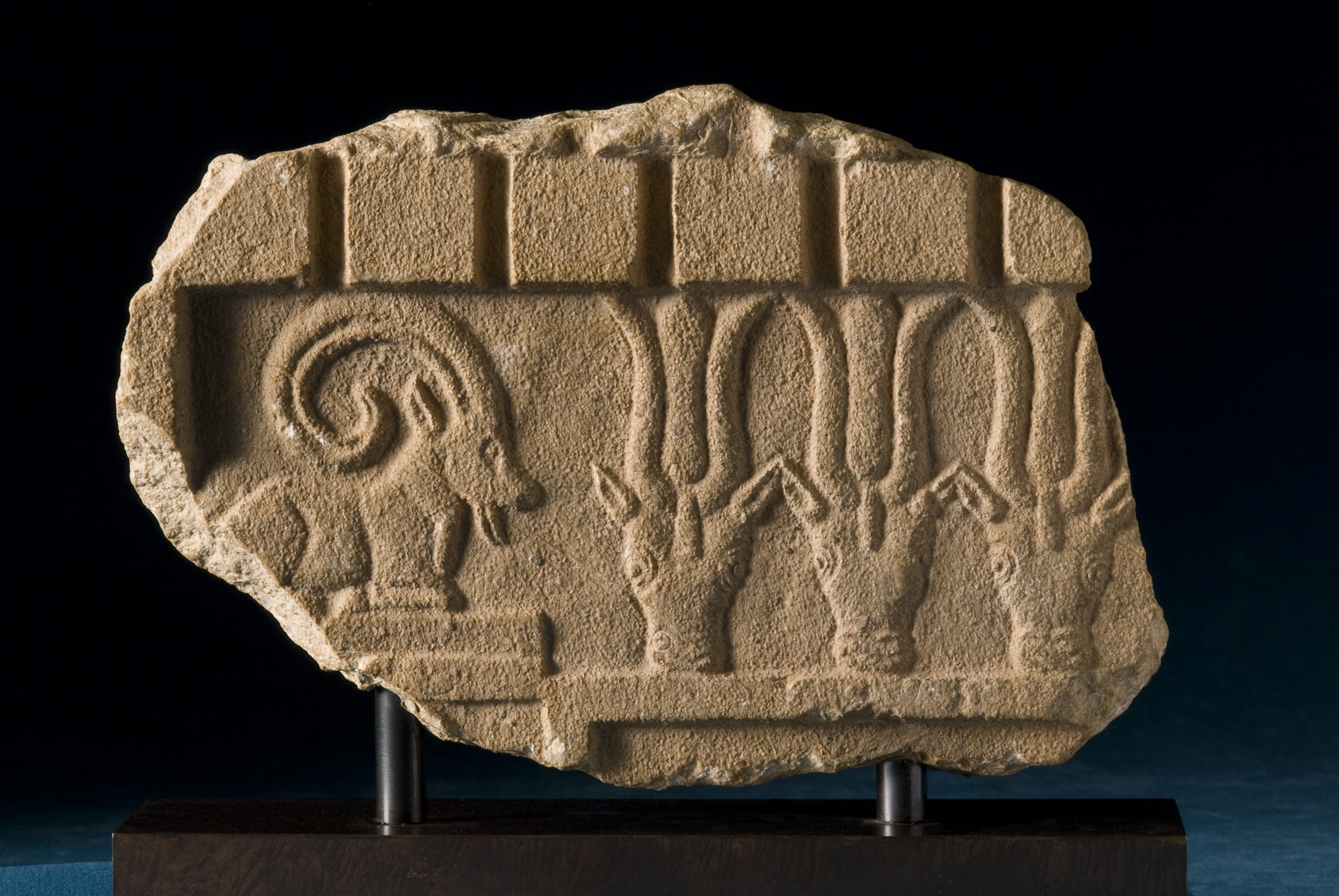
A South Arabian stela with an ibex and three Arabian oryx, associated with Astar (ዐስተር), Semitic god of the Morning and Evening Star

Before its conversion to Christianity, the Aksumites practiced a polytheistic religion related to the religion practiced in southern Arabia. This included the use of the crescent-and-disc symbol used in southern Arabia and the northern horn. In the UNESCO-sponsored General History of Africa, French archaeologist Francis Anfray suggests that the Aksumites worshipped Astar, his son Mahrem, and Beher.

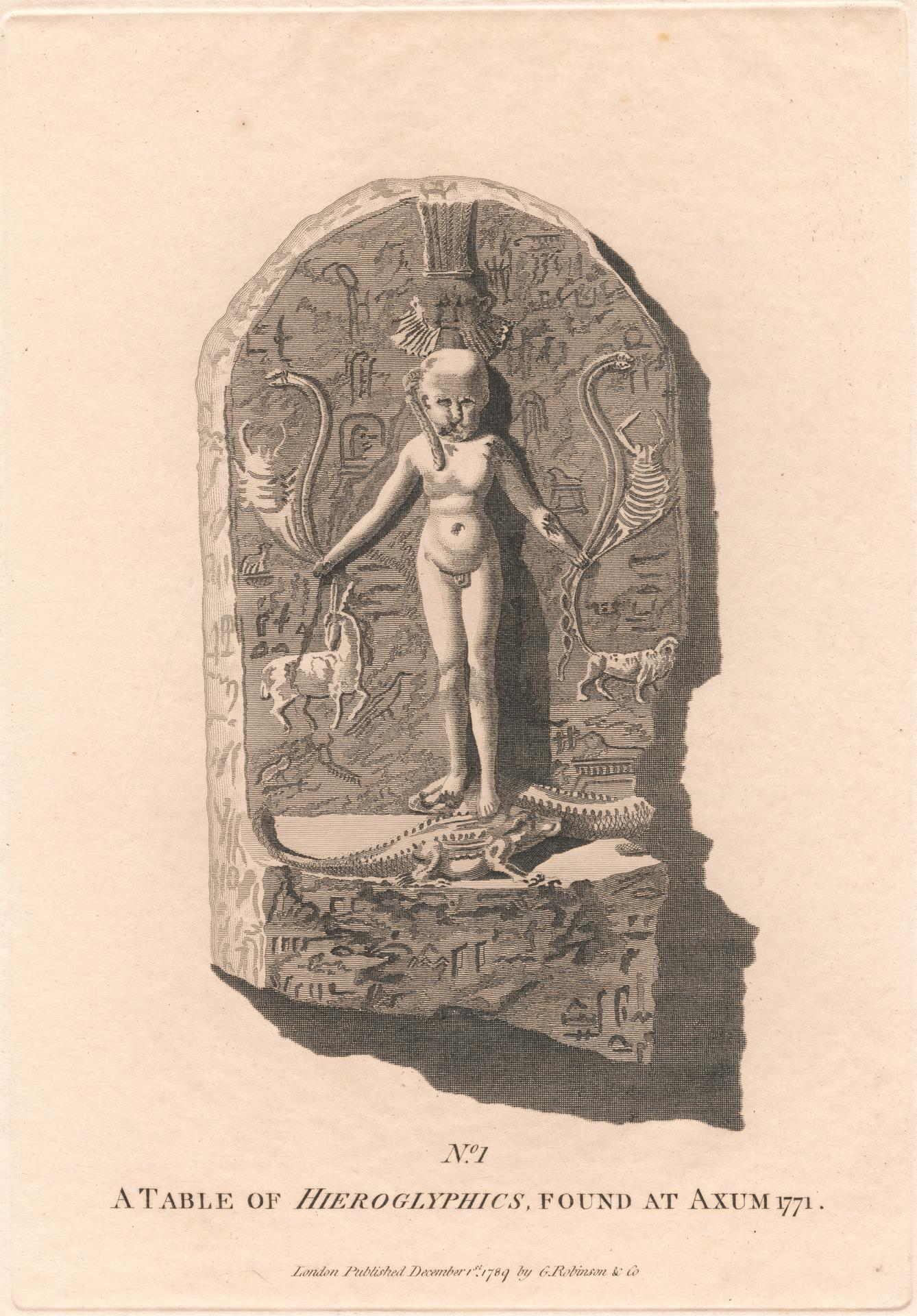
A Table of Hieroglyphics found at Axum c. 19th century

Steve Kaplan argues that with Aksumite culture came a major change in religion, with only Astar remaining of the old gods, the others being replaced by what he calls a "triad of indigenous divinities, Mahrem, Beher and Medr." He also suggests that Aksum culture was significantly influenced by Judaism, saying that "The first carriers of Judaism reached Ethiopia between the reign of Queen of Sheba BC and conversion to Christianity of King Ezana in the fourth century AD." He believes that although Ethiopian tradition suggests that these were present in large numbers, "A relatively small number of texts and individuals dwelling in the cultural, economic, and political center could have had a considerable impact", and that "their influence was diffused throughout Ethiopian culture in its formative period. By the time Christianity took hold in the fourth century, many of the originally Hebraic-Jewish elements had been adopted by much of the indigenous population and were no longer viewed as foreign characteristics. Nor were they perceived as in conflict with the acceptance of Christianity."

Before converting to Christianity, King Ezana II's coins and inscriptions show that he might have worshiped the gods Astar, Beher, Meder/Medr, and Mahrem. Another of Ezana's inscriptions is clearly Christian and refers to "the Father, the Son, and the Holy Spirit". Around 324 AD the King Ezana II was converted to Christianity by his teacher Frumentius, who established the Axumite Coptic Church, which later became the modern Ethiopian Orthodox Church. Frumentius taught the emperor while he was young, and it is believed that at some point staged the conversion of the empire. We know that the Aksumites converted to Christianity because in their coins they replaced the disc and crescent with the cross.

Frumentius was in contact with the Church of Alexandria, and was appointed Bishop of Ethiopia around the year 330. The Church of Alexandria never closely managed the affairs of the churches in Aksum, allowing them to develop their own unique form of Christianity. However, the Church of Alexandria probably did retain some influence considering that the churches of Aksum followed the Church of Alexandria into Oriental Orthodoxy by rejecting the Fourth Ecumenical Council of Chalcedon. Aksum is also the alleged home of the holy relic the Ark of the Covenant. The Ark is said to have been placed in the Church of Our Lady Mary of Zion by Menelik I for safekeeping.

Islam arrived in the seventh century, during the reign of Ashama ibn-Abjar, when the first followers of the Islamic prophet Muhammad (also known as the Sahabah) migrated from Arabia due to their persecution by the Quraysh, the ruling Arab tribal confederation of Mecca. The Quraysh appealed to the Ashama ibn-Abjar, arguing that the early Muslim migrants were rebels who had invented a new religion, the likes of which neither the Meccans nor the Aksumites had heard of. The king granted them an audience, but ultimately refused to hand over the migrants. A second migration consisting of 100 Muslim migrants occurred a few years later. Arabic inscriptions on the Dahlak Archipelago dated to the mid ninth century AD. confirm the existence of an early Muslim presence in Aksum.

=== Coinage ===
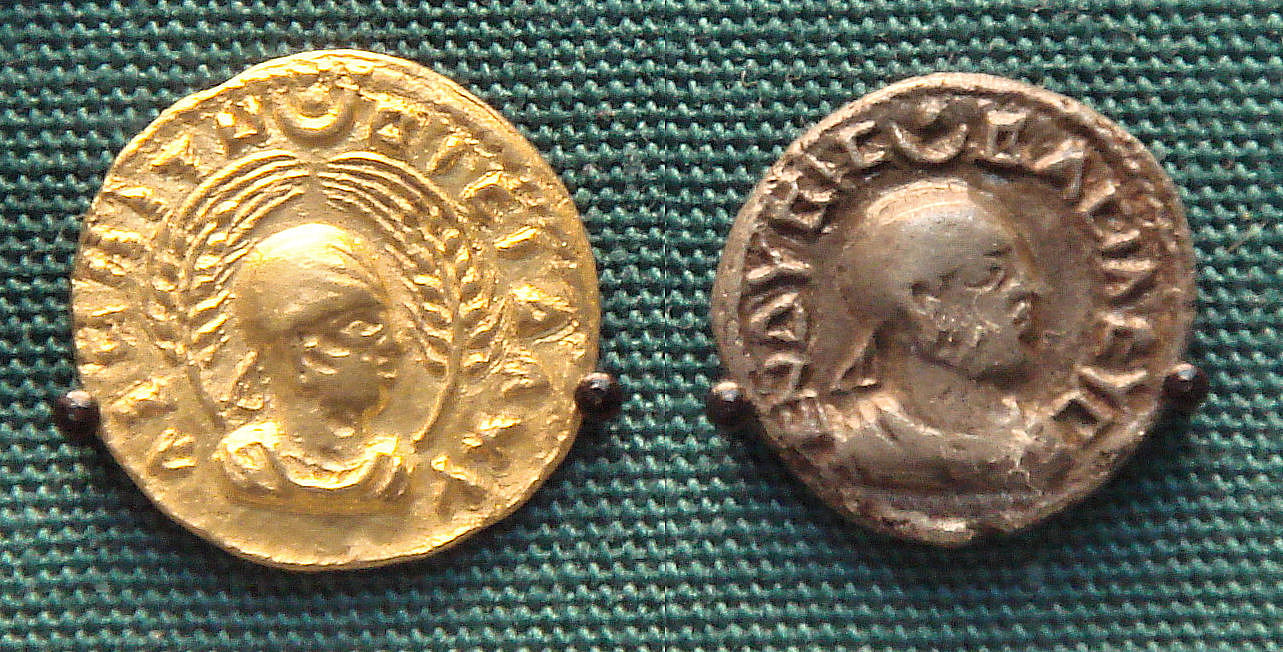
Coins of king Endybis, 227–235 AD. The right coin reads in Greek ΕΝΔΥΒΙϹ ΒΑϹΙΛΕΥϹ 'King Endybis'

The Empire of Aksum was one of the first African polities to issue its own coins, which bore legends in Geʽez and Greek. From the reign of Endybis up to Armah (c. 270 – c. 610), gold, silver and bronze coins were minted. Issuing coinage in ancient times was an act of great importance in itself, for it proclaimed that the Aksumite Empire considered itself equal to its neighbours. Many of the coins are used as signposts about what was happening when they were minted. An example being the addition of the cross to the coin after the conversion of the empire to Christianity. The presence of coins also simplified trade, and was at once a useful instrument of propaganda and a source of profit to the empire.

=== Architecture ===
==== Palace architecture ====
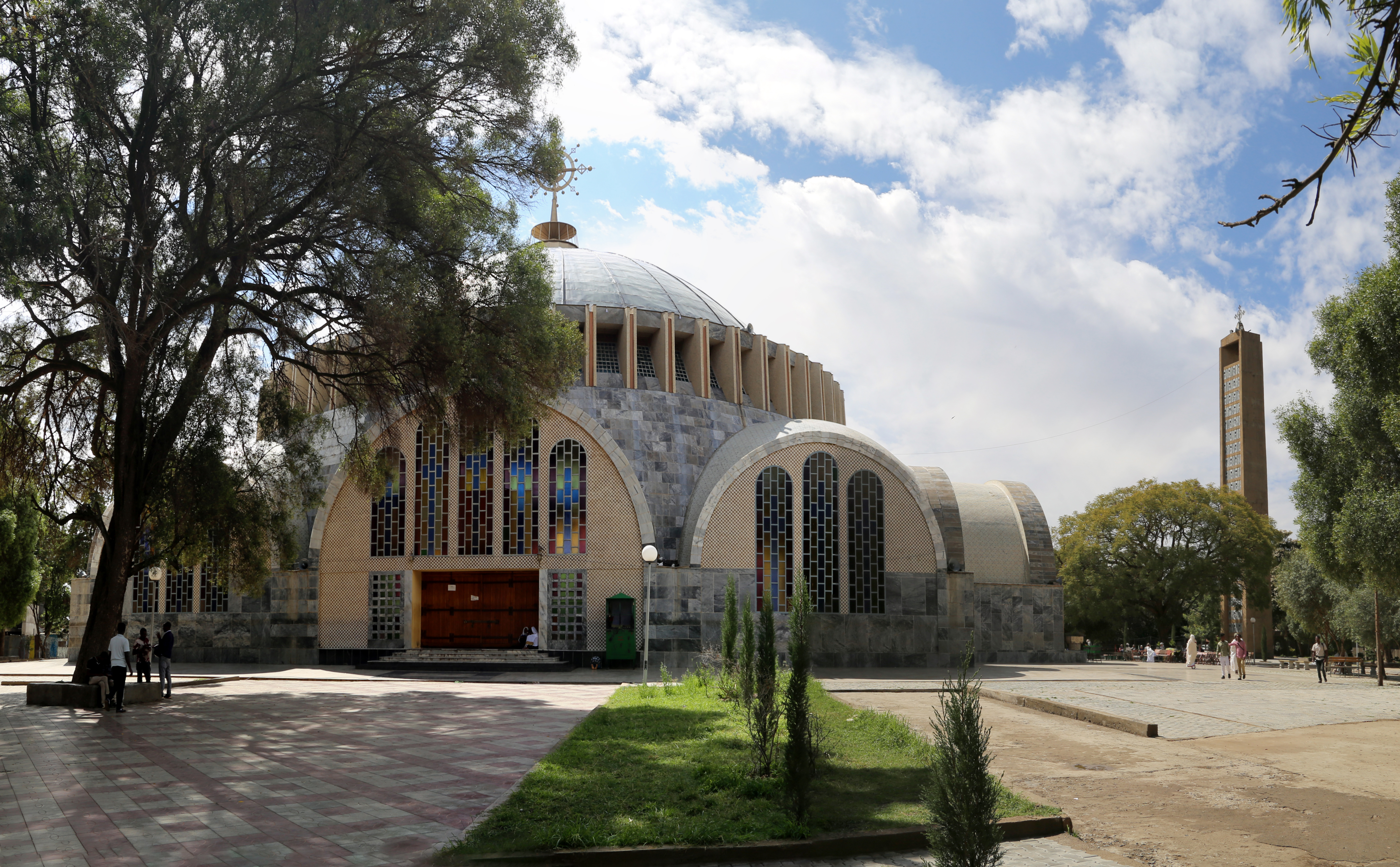
An Axumite Cathedral, Lady Mary of Zion

In general, elite Aksumite buildings such as palaces were constructed atop podia built of loose stones held together with mud-mortar, with carefully cut granite corner blocks which rebated back a few centimeters at regular intervals as the wall got higher, so the walls narrowed as they rose higher. These podia are often all that survive of Aksumite ruins. Above the podia, walls were generally built with alternating layers of loose stone (often whitewashed, like at Yemrehana Krestos Church) and horizontal wooden beams, with smaller round wooden beams set in the stonework often projecting out of the walls (these are called 'monkey heads') on the exterior and sometimes the interior.

Both the podia and the walls above exhibited no long straight stretches but were indented at regular intervals so that any long walls consisted of a series of recesses and salients. This helped to strengthen the walls. Worked granite was used for architectural features including columns, bases, capitals, doors, windows, paving, water spouts (often shaped like lion heads) and so on, as well as enormous flights of stairs that often flanked the walls of palace pavilions on several sides. Doors and windows were usually framed by stone or wooden cross-members, linked at the corners by square 'monkey heads', though simple lintels were also used. Many of these Aksumite features are seen carved into the famous stelae as well as in the later rock hewn churches of Tigray and Lalibela.

Palaces usually consisted of a central pavilion surrounded by subsidiary structures pierced by doors and gates that provided some privacy (see Dungur for an example). The largest of these structures now known is the Ta'akha Maryam, which measured 120 × 80m, though as its pavilion was smaller than others discovered it is likely that others were even larger.

Some clay models of houses survive to give us an idea of what smaller dwellings were like. One depicts a round hut with a conical roof thatched in layers, while another depicts a rectangular house with rectangular doors and windows, a roof supported by beams that end in 'monkey heads', and a parapet and water spout on the roof. Both were found in Hawelti. Another depicts a square house with what appear to be layers of pitched thatch forming the roof.

==== Stelae ====
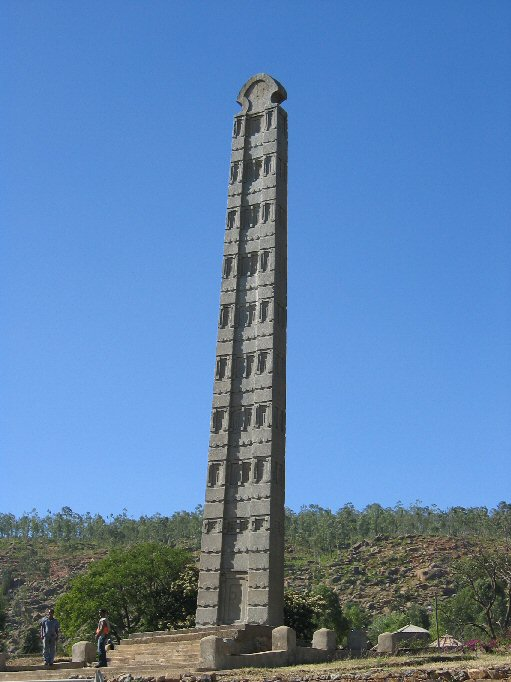
The King Ezana's Stela, an Aksumite obelisk in Axum, Ethiopia

The stelae are perhaps the most identifiable part of the Aksumite architectural legacy. These stone towers served to mark graves and represent a magnificent multi-storied palace. They are decorated with false doors and windows in typical Aksumite design. The largest of these would measure 33 meters high had it not fractured. The stelae have most of their mass out of the ground, but are stabilized by massive underground counterweights. The stone was often engraved with a pattern or emblem denoting the king's or the noble's rank.

For important monuments built in the region, a particular type of granite is used called nepheline syenite. It is fine grained and has also been used in historic monuments like the stelae. These monuments are used to celebrate key figures in Axum history, especially kings or priests. These stelae are also called obelisks, they are located in the Mai Hejja stelae field, where complex sedimentology of the land can be observed. The foundations for the monuments are around 8.5 m below the surface of the Mai Hejja stelae field. Sediments in this area have undergone a lot of weathering over the years, so the surface of this area has undergone a lot of changes. This is part of the reason for the complex stratigraphic history in this site, some previous layers under the surface of the site.

==== Tombs ====
Aksumite funerary monuments combined stone platforms with one of three tomb types: pit-graves consisting of a circular rock-cut shaft over two metres deep beneath a platform; shaft-tombs formed by a quadrangular shaft between three and eight metres deep leading to one or more burial chambers; and staircase tombs entered by rock-cut staircases. Pottery basins placed on platform surfaces indicate these superstructures also served as sites for votive offerings to the dead. Several individual tombs are known from Aksum. One of the oldest is at Näfas Mawca, dated to the third century AD, where the burial is covered by a single stone block measuring 17 by 7 by 1 metres.

The Tomb of the Brick Arches, dating to the early or mid-fourth century, lies beneath a structure of mud-mortared stones and contains a horseshoe arch of square bricks. A still larger structure, called the Mausoleum, was entered through a massive fifteen-metre square granite doorway and had ten adjacent rooms. The Tomb of the False Door, probably built in the late fourth or early fifth century, features a false-door facade with the symmetrical recessed planes characteristic of Aksumite design. High-ranking individuals were buried in individual stone coffins with jewellery and personal objects, while those of lower status were interred without coffins and with only a small number of grave goods such as pottery, glassware, and iron tools.

=== Foreign relations, trade, and economy ===
Aksum was an important participant in international trade from the first century AD (Periplus of the Erythraean Sea) until circa the later part of the 1st millennium when it succumbed to a long decline against pressures from the various Islamic powers leagued against it.

Covering parts of what is now northern Ethiopia and southern and eastern Eritrea, Aksum was deeply involved in the trade network between the Indian subcontinent and the Mediterranean (Rome, later Byzantium), exporting ivory, tortoise shell, gold and emeralds, and importing silk and spices. Aksum's access to both the Red Sea and the Upper Nile enabled its strong navy to profit in trade between various African (Nubia), Arabian (Yemen), and Indian states.

The main exports of Aksum were, as would be expected of a state during this time, agricultural products. The land was much more fertile during the time of the Aksumites than now, and their principal crops were grains such as wheat, barley and teff. The people of Aksum also raised cattle, sheep, and camels. Wild animals were also hunted for things such as ivory and rhinoceros horns. They traded with Roman traders as well as with Egyptian and Persian merchants. The empire was also rich with gold and iron deposits. These metals were valuable to trade, but another mineral was also widely traded: salt. Salt was abundant in Aksum and was traded quite frequently.

It benefited from a major transformation of the maritime trading system that linked the Roman Empire and India. This change took place around the start of the first century. The older trading system involved coastal sailing and many intermediary ports. The Red Sea was of secondary importance to the Persian Gulf and overland connections to the Levant. Starting around the first century, a route from Egypt to India was established, making use of the Red Sea and using monsoon winds to cross the Arabian Sea directly to southern India. By about 100 AD, the volume of traffic being shipped on this route had eclipsed older routes. Roman demand for goods from southern India increased dramatically, resulting in greater number of large ships sailing down the Red Sea from Roman Egypt to the Arabian Sea and India.

Although excavations have been limited, fourteen Roman coins dating to the second and third centuries have been discovered at Aksumite sites like Matara. This suggests that trade with the Roman Empire existed at least since this period.

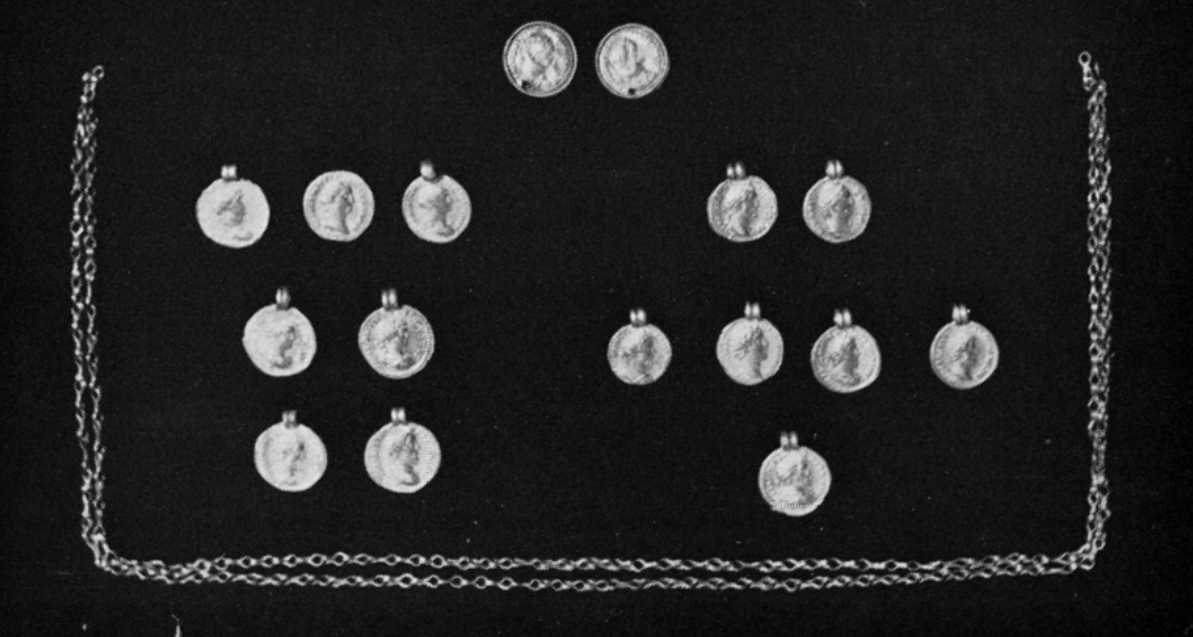
14 Roman Coins found in Matara in 2-3rd century

In 525 AD, the Aksumites attempted to take over the Yemen region to gain control over The Straits of Bab-el-Mandeb; one of the most significant trading routes in the medieval world, connecting the Red Sea to the Indian Ocean. Rulers were inclined to establish a spot of imperialism across the Red Sea in Yemen to completely control the trading vessels that ran down the Straits of Bab-el-Mandeb. It is located in the maritime choke point between Yemen and Djibouti and Eritrea. Because of the ruler of Yemen's persecution of Christians in 523 AD, Kaleb I, the ruler of Aksum (a Christian region) at the time, responded to the persecutions by attacking the Himyarite king Yūsuf As'ar Yath'ar, known as Dhu Nuwas, a Jewish convert who was persecuting the Christian community of Najran, Yemen in 525 AD, with the help of the Byzantine empire, with whom had ties with his kingdom. Victoriously, the Aksum empire was able to claim the Yemen region, establishing a viceroy in the region and troops to defend it until 570 AD when the Sassanids invaded.

The Kingdom of Aksum was ideally located to take advantage of the new trading situation. Adulis soon became the main port for the export of African goods, such as ivory, incense, gold, slaves, and exotic animals. In order to supply such goods the kings of Aksum worked to develop and expand an inland trading network. A rival, and much older trading network that tapped the same interior region of Africa was that of the Kingdom of Kush, which had long supplied Egypt with African goods via the Nile corridor. By the first century AD, however, Aksum had gained control over territory previously Kushite. The Periplus of the Erythraean Sea explicitly describes how ivory collected in Kushite territory was being exported through the port of Adulis instead of being taken to Meroë, the capital of Kush. During the second and third centuries AD the Kingdom of Aksum continued to expand their control of the southern Red Sea basin. A caravan route to Egypt was established which bypassed the Nile corridor entirely. Aksum succeeded in becoming the principal supplier of African goods to the Roman Empire, not least as a result of the transformed Indian Ocean trading system.

==== Climate change hypothesis ====
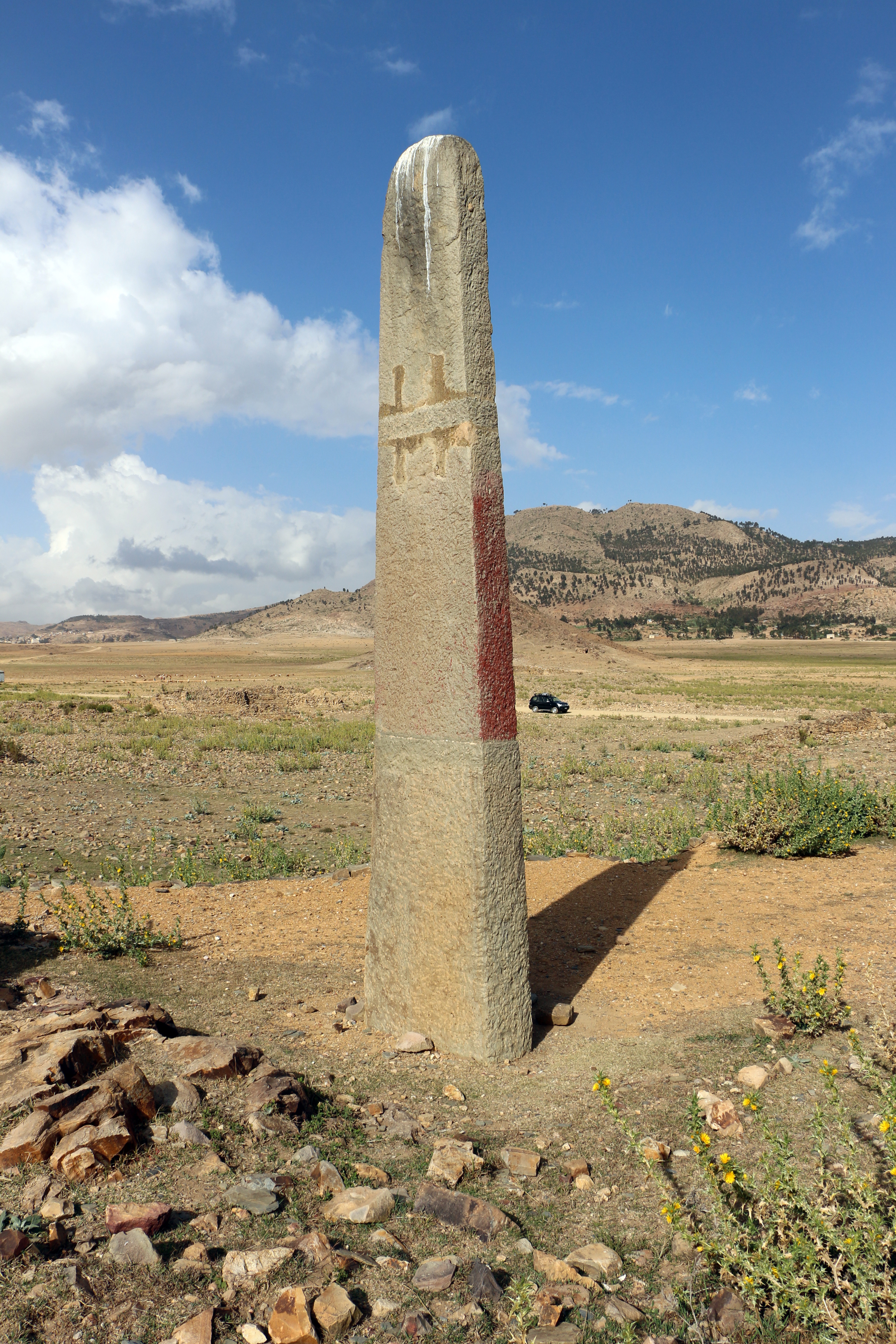
Axumite Menhir in Balaw Kalaw (Metera) near Senafe

Climate change and trade isolation have also been claimed as large reasons for the decline of the culture. The local subsistence base was substantially augmented by a climatic shift during the first century AD that reinforced the spring rains, extended the rainy season from 3 1/2 to six or seven months, vastly improved the surface and subsurface water supply, doubled the length of the growing season, and created an environment comparable to that of modern central Ethiopia (where two crops can be grown per annum without the aid of irrigation).

Askum was also located on a plateau 2,000 m (6,600 ft) feet above sea level, making its soil fertile and the land good for agriculture. This appears to explain how one of the marginal agricultural environments of Ethiopia was able to support the demographic base that made this far flung commercial empire possible. It may also explain why no Aksumite rural settlement expansion into the moister, more fertile, and naturally productive lands of Begemder or Lasta can be verified during the heyday of Aksumite power.

As international profits from the exchange network declined, Aksum lost control over its raw material sources, and that network collapsed. The persistent environmental pressure on a large population needing to maintain a high level of regional food production intensified, which resulted in a wave of soil erosion that began on a local scale c. 650, and reached crisis levels after 700. Additional socioeconomic contingencies presumably compounded the problem: these are traditionally reflected in a decline in maintenance, the deterioration and partial abandonment of marginal crop lands, shifts toward more destructive exploitation of pasture land—and ultimately wholesale, irreversible land degradation. This decline was possibly accelerated by an apparent decline in the reliability of rainfall beginning between 730 and 760, presumably with the result that an abbreviated modern growing season was reestablished during the ninth century.

== In literature ==
The Aksumite Empire is portrayed as the main ally of Byzantium in the Belisarius series by David Drake and Eric Flint published by Baen Books. The series takes place during the reign of Kaleb, who in the series was assassinated by the Malwa in 532 at the Ta'akha Maryam and succeeded by his youngest son Eon bisi Dakuen.

In the Elizabeth Wein series The Lion Hunters, Mordred and his family take refuge in Aksum after the fall of Camelot. Kaleb is the ruler in the first book; he passes his sovereignty onto his son Gebre Meskal, who rules during the Plague of Justinian.

== Gallery ==
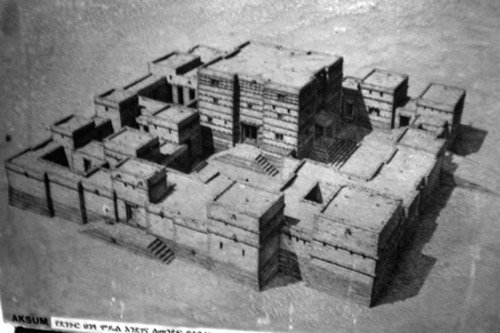
Reconstruction of Dungur

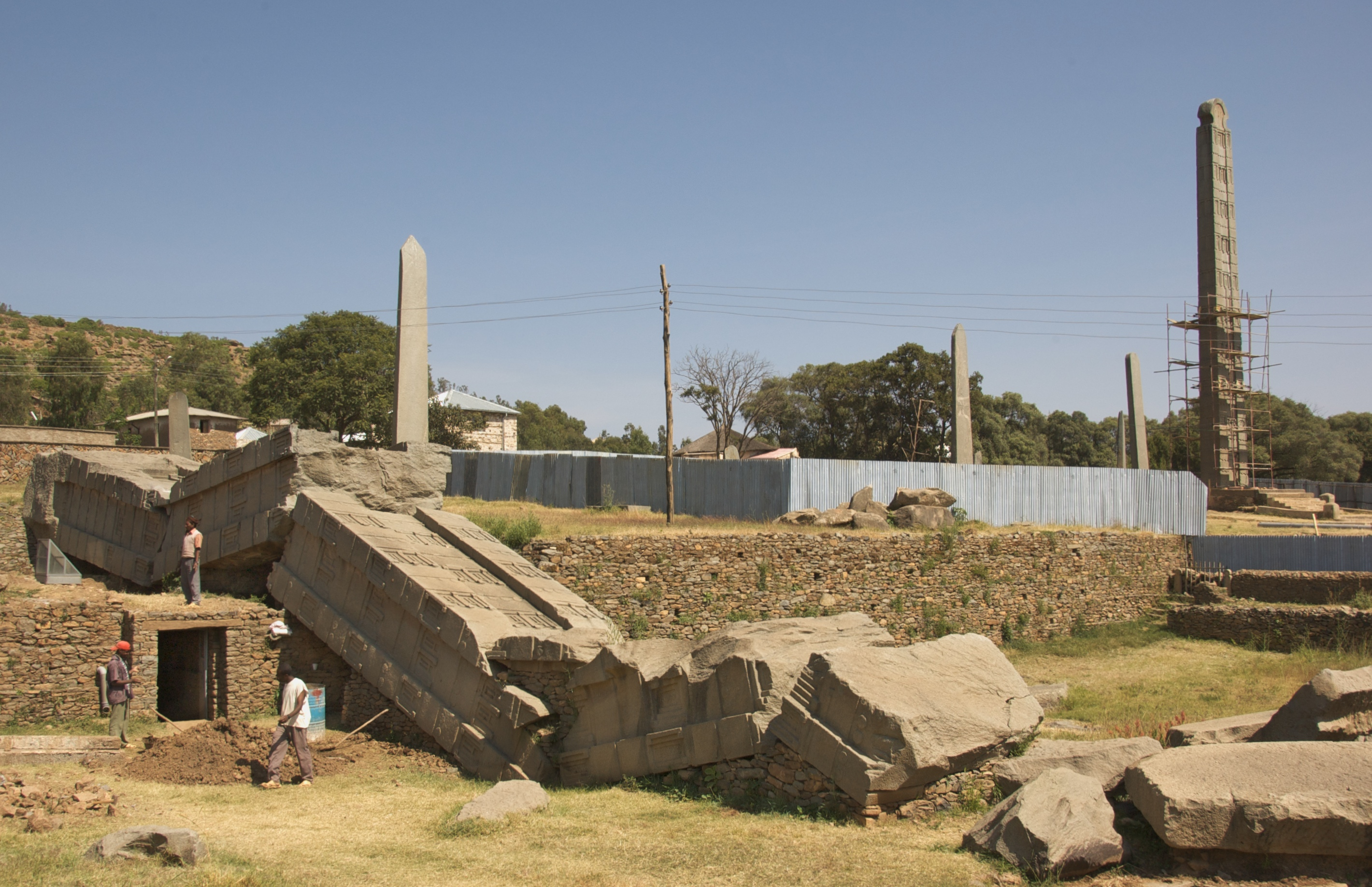
The largest Aksumite stele, broken where it fell.

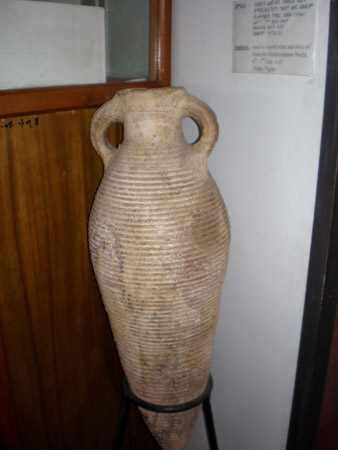
Aksumite-era Amphora from Asmara.

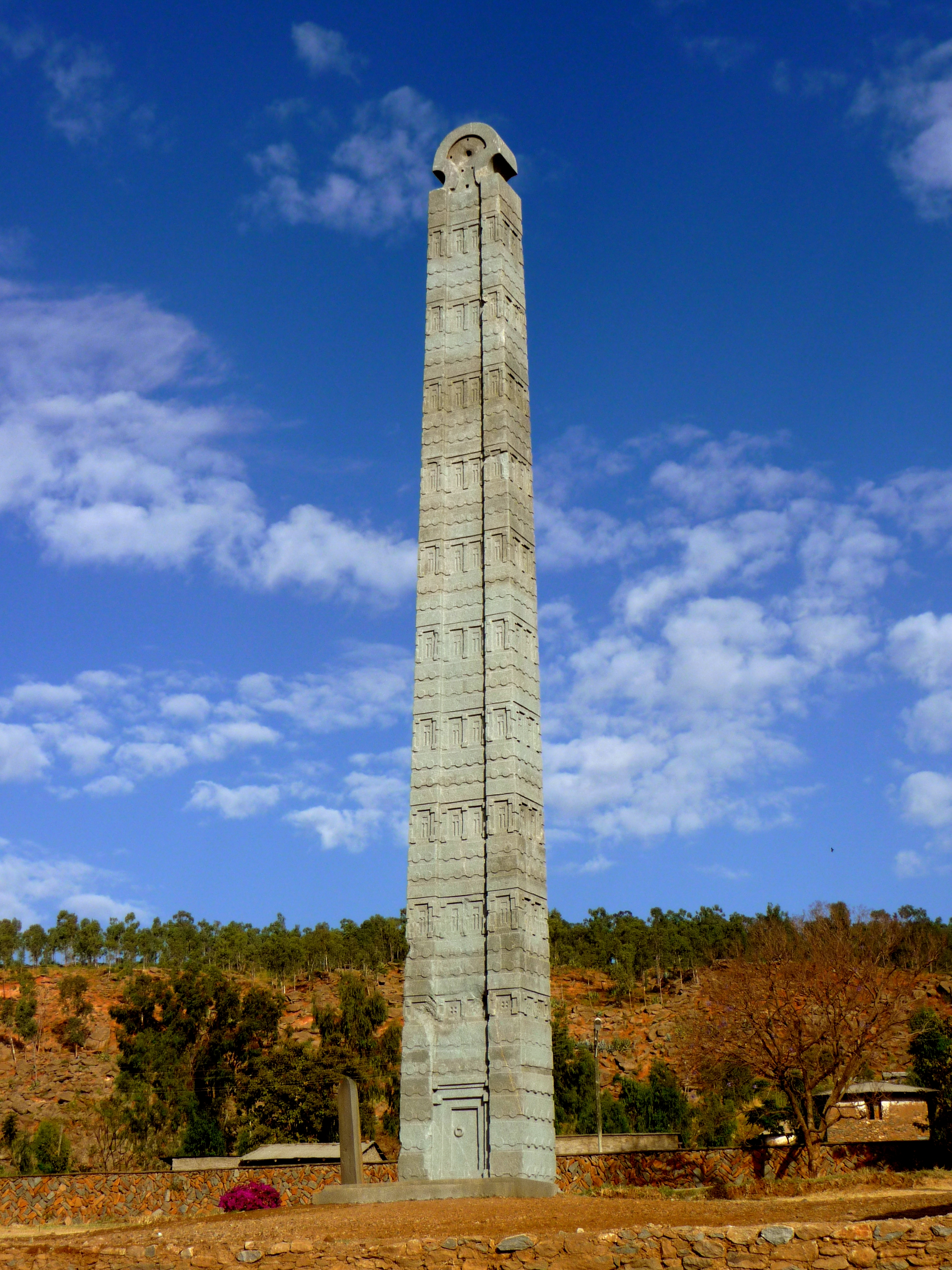
The Obelisk of Aksum after being returned to Ethiopia.

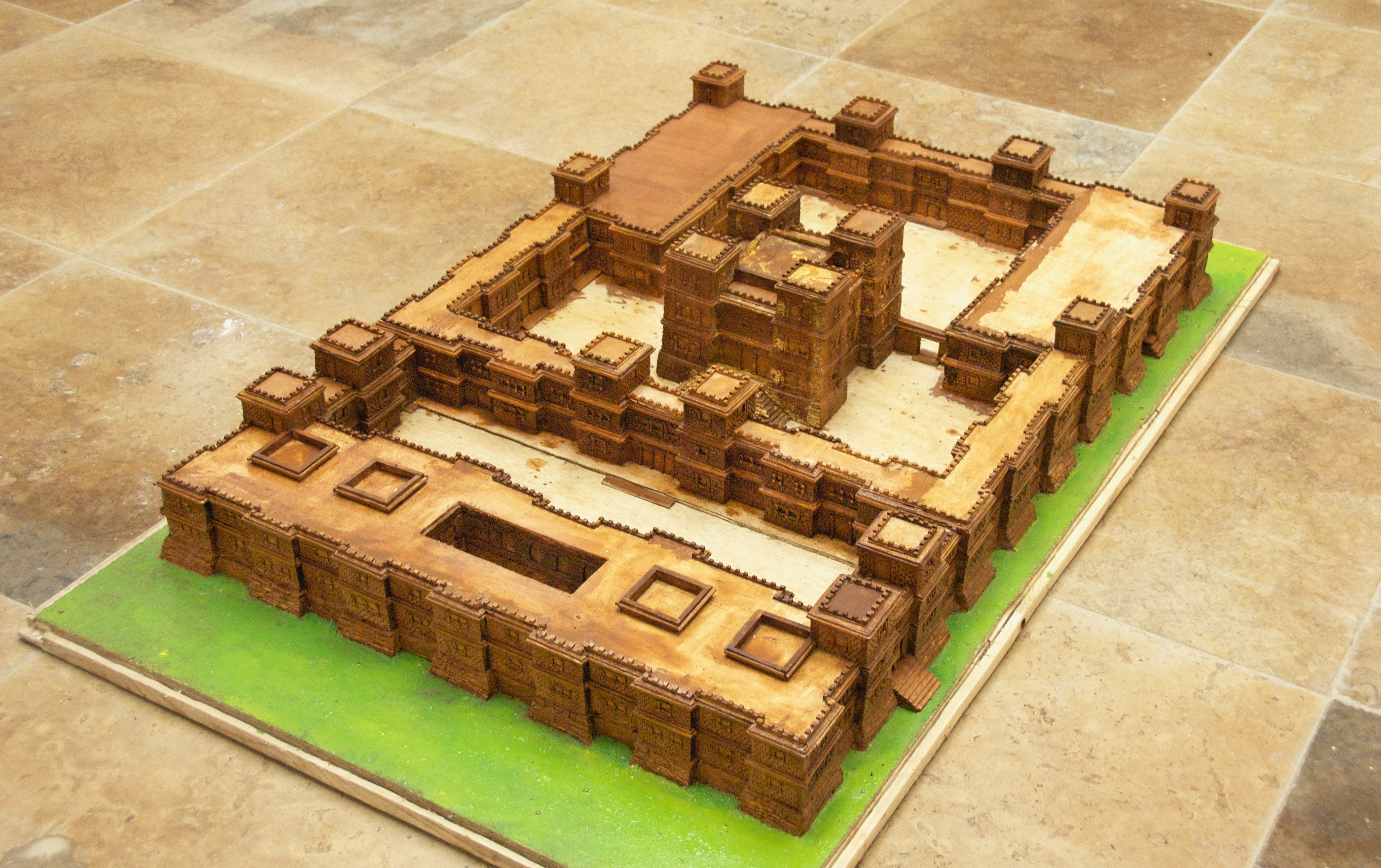
Model of the Ta'akha Maryam palace.

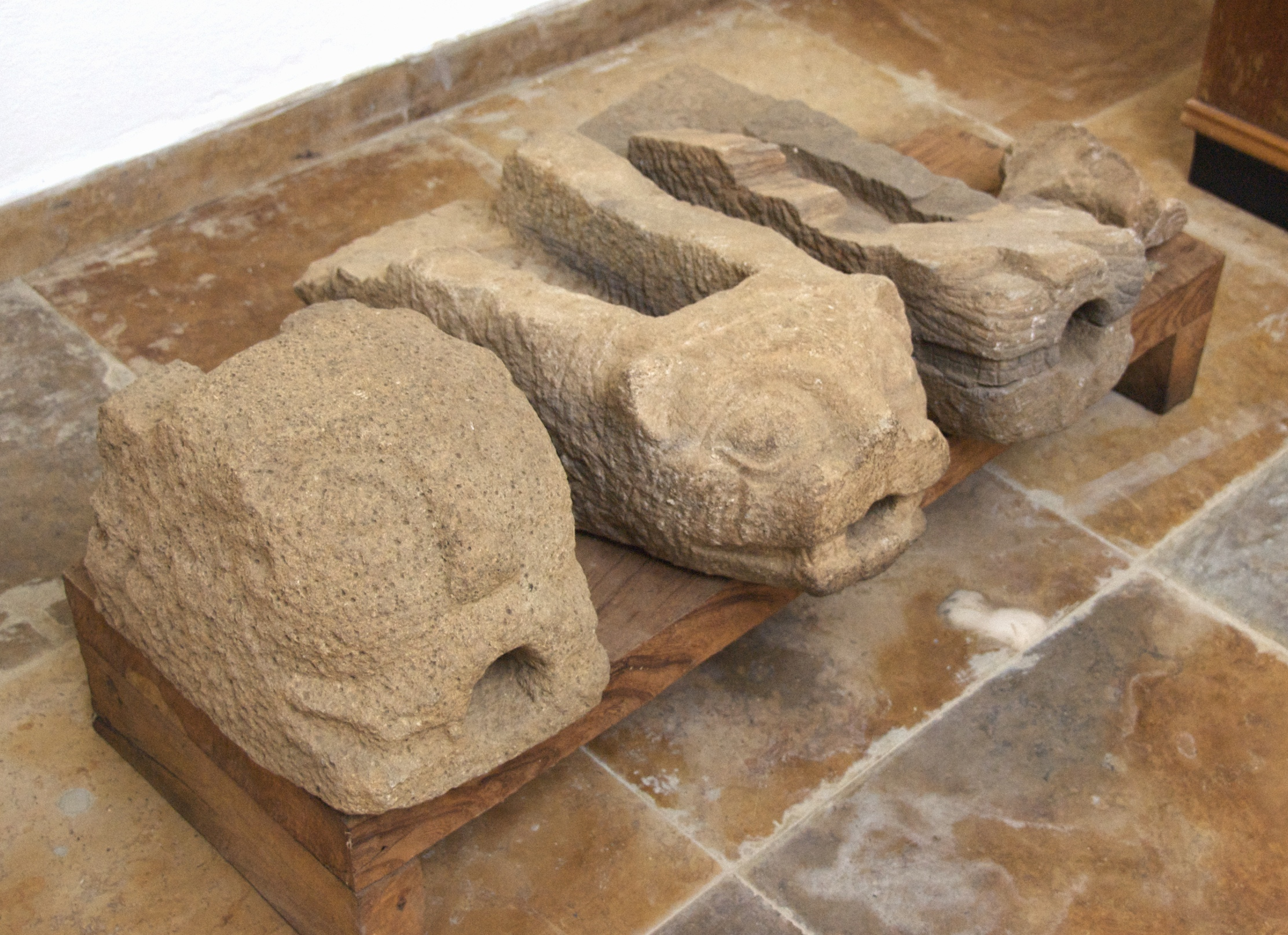
Aksumite water-spouts in the shape of lion heads.

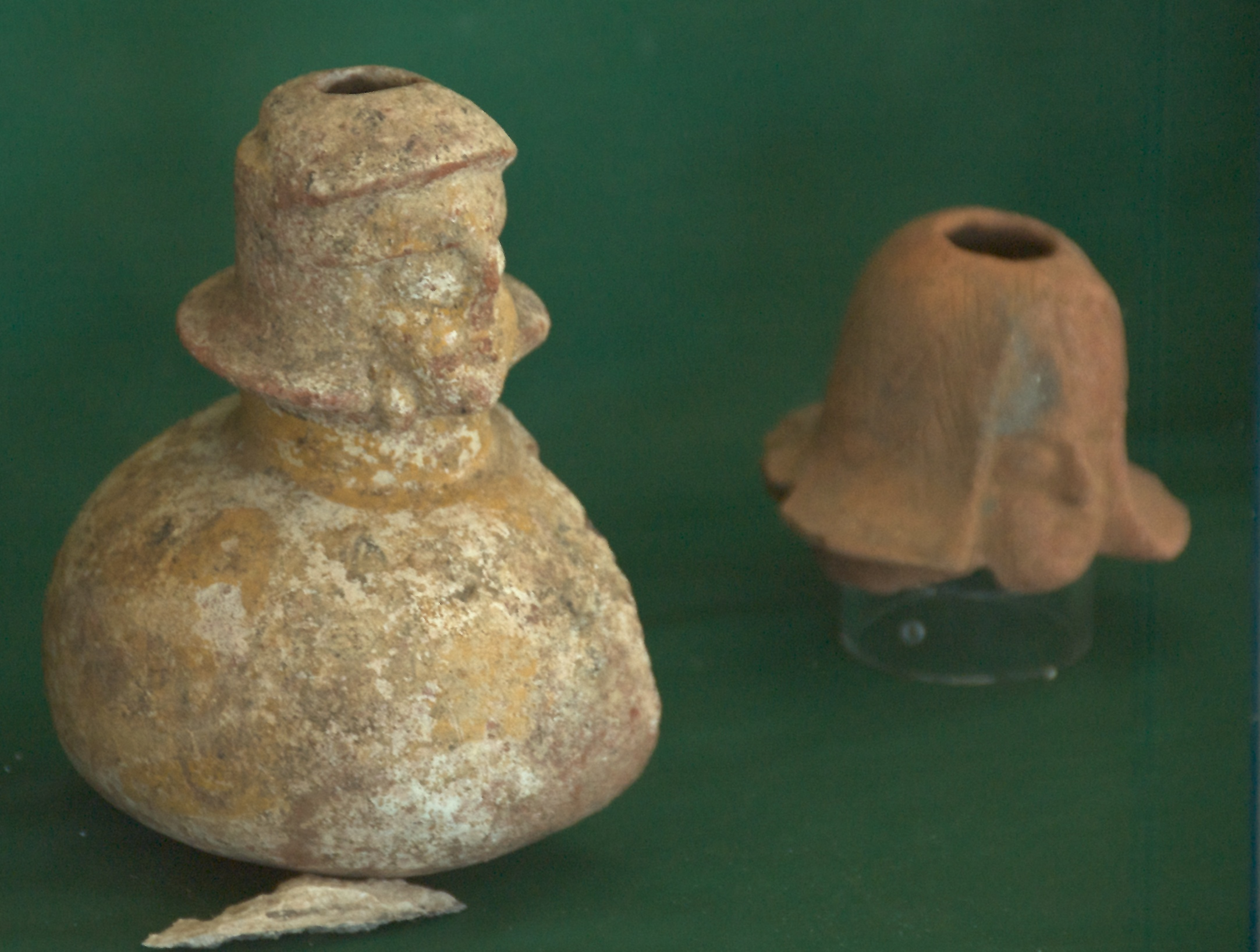
Aksumite jar with figural spout.

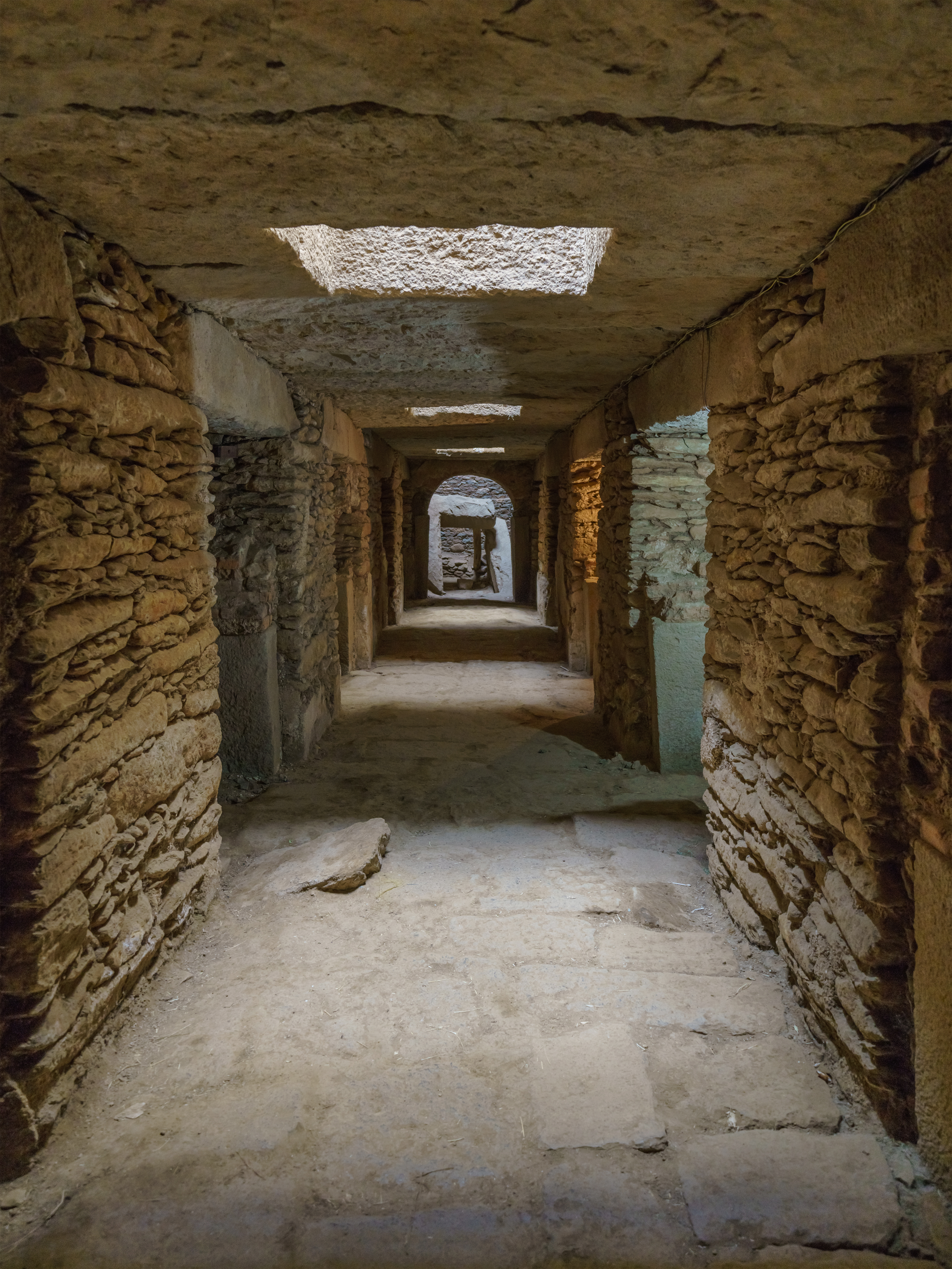
Tombs beneath the stele field.

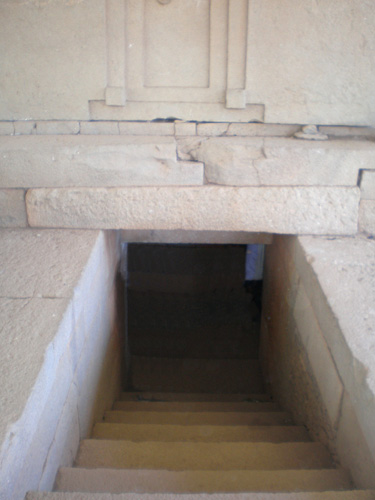
Entrance to the Tomb Of The False Door.

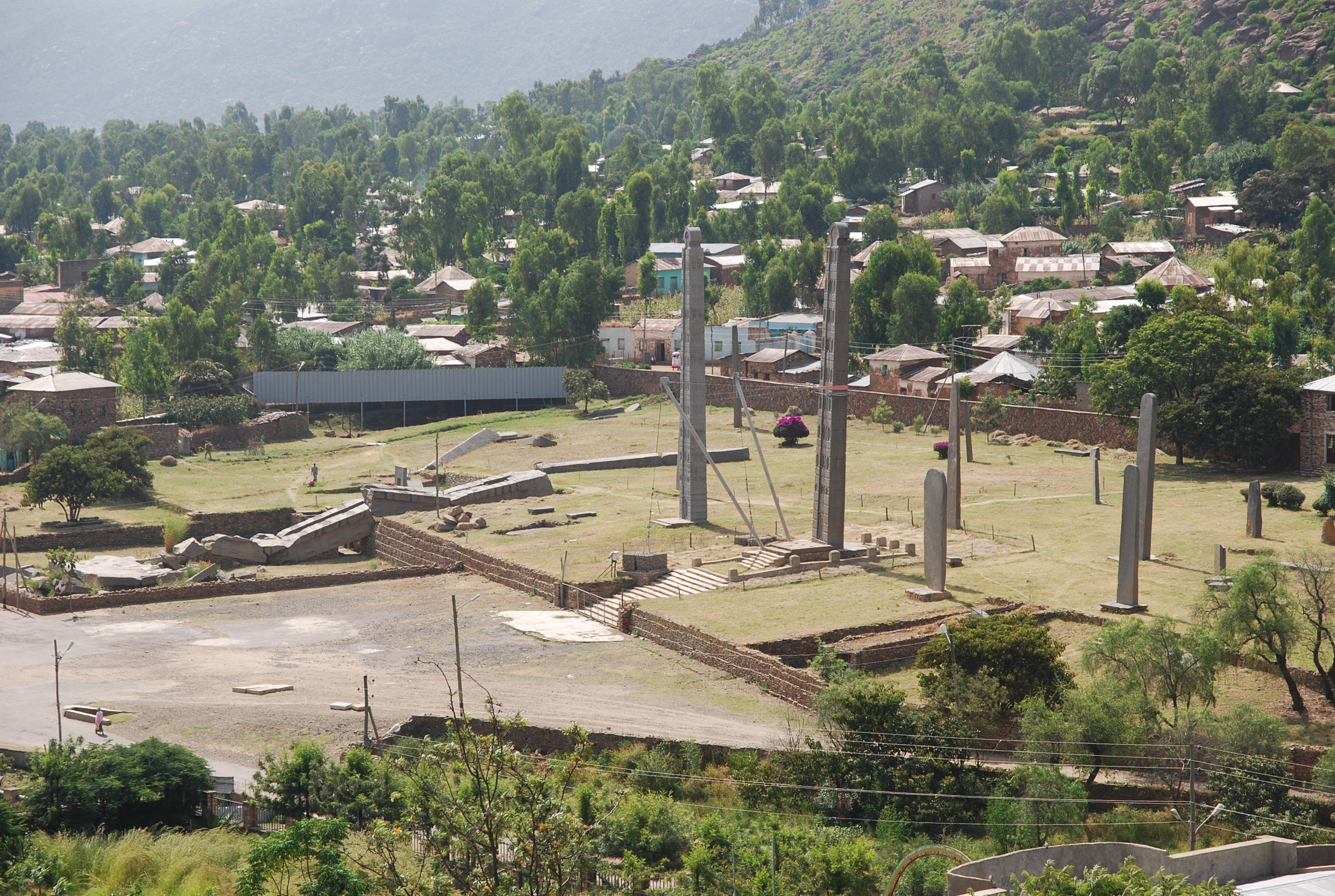
The Stelae Park in Aksum.

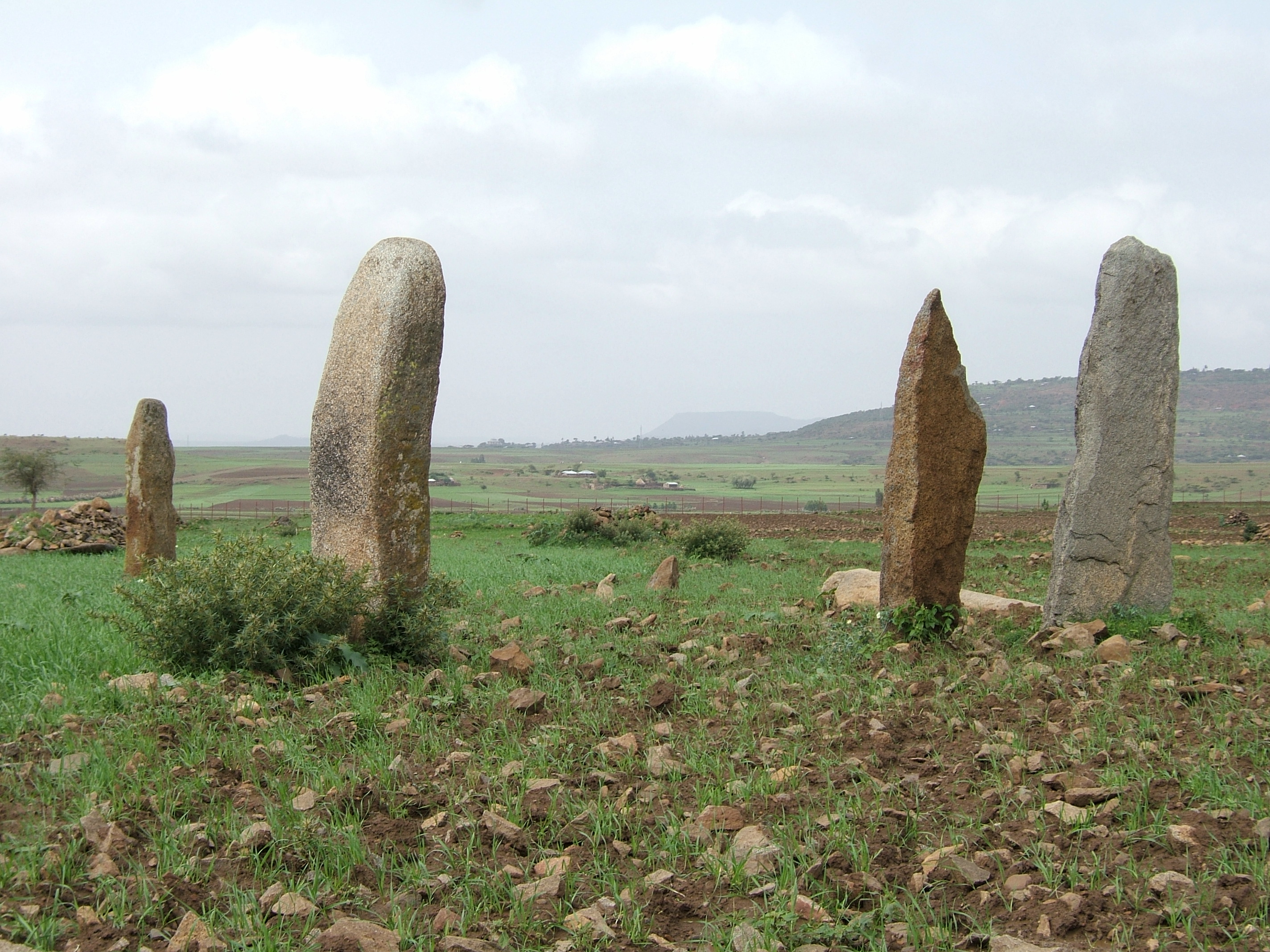
Small stelae in the Gudit Stelae Field

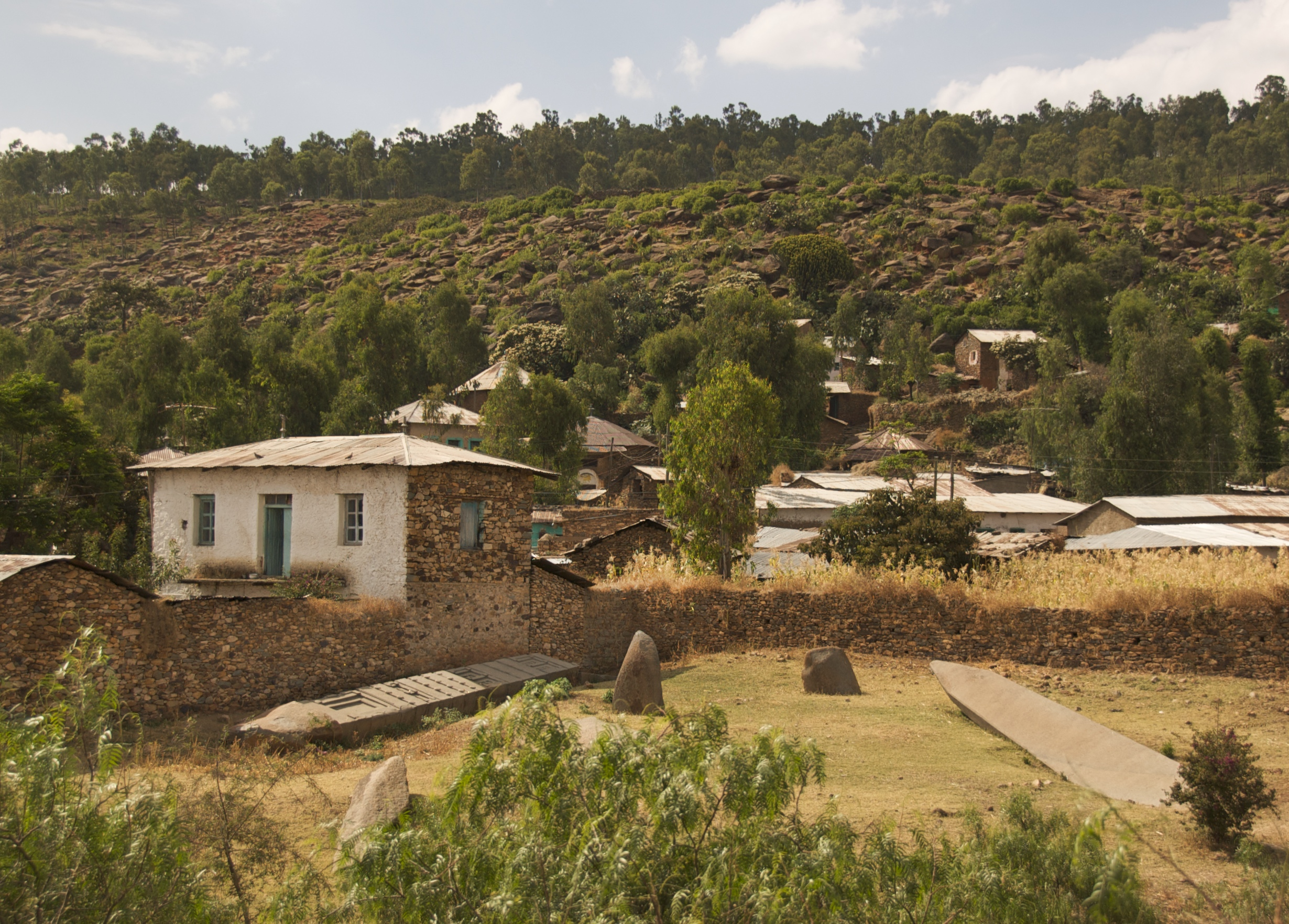
Another stelae field in Aksum.

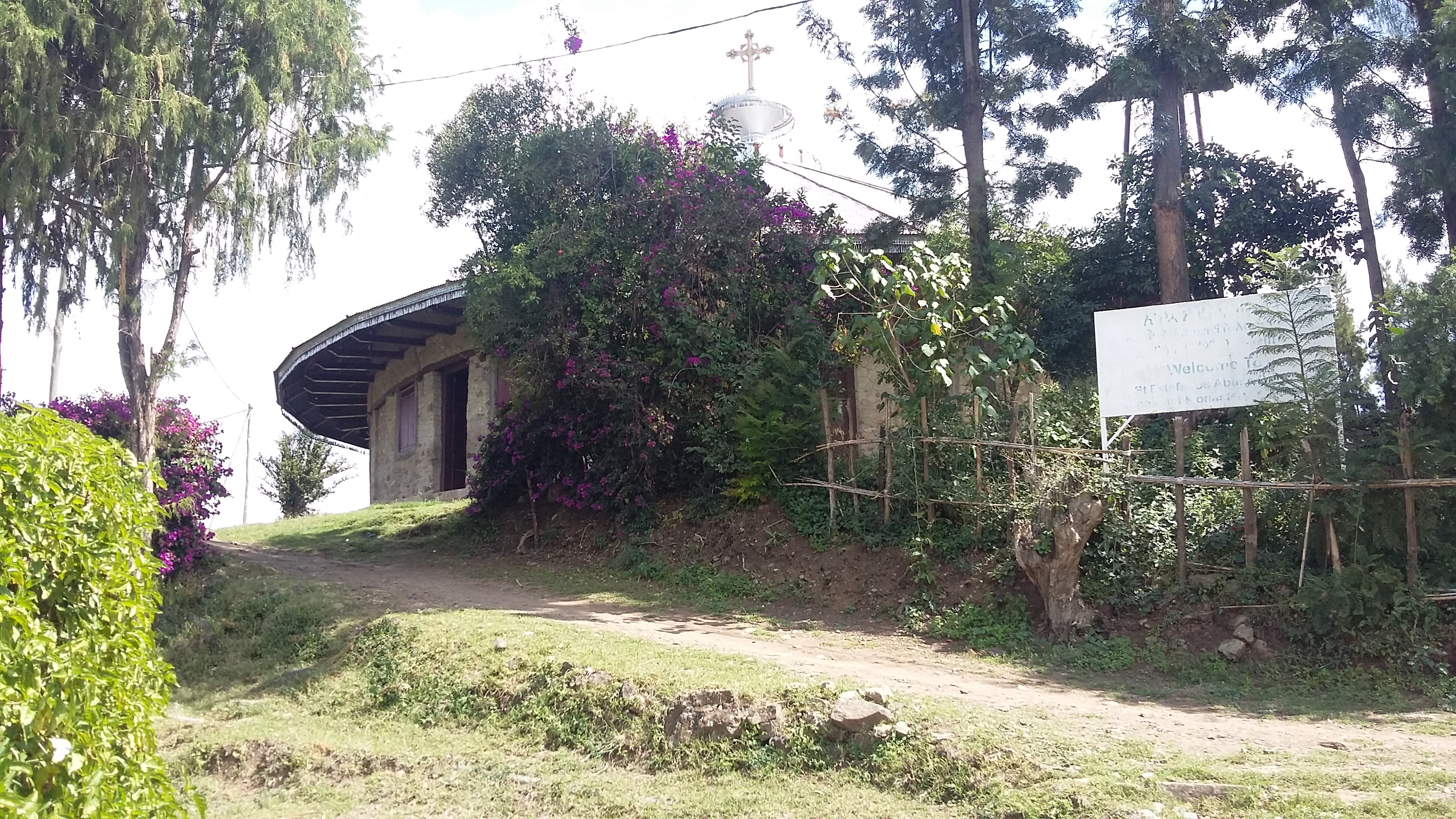
Istifanos Monastery in Hayk.

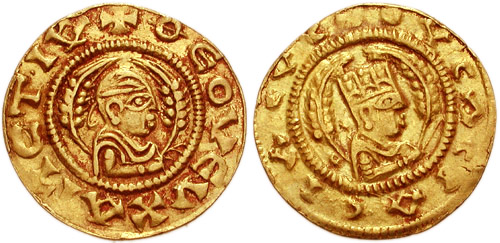
Aksumite gold coins.

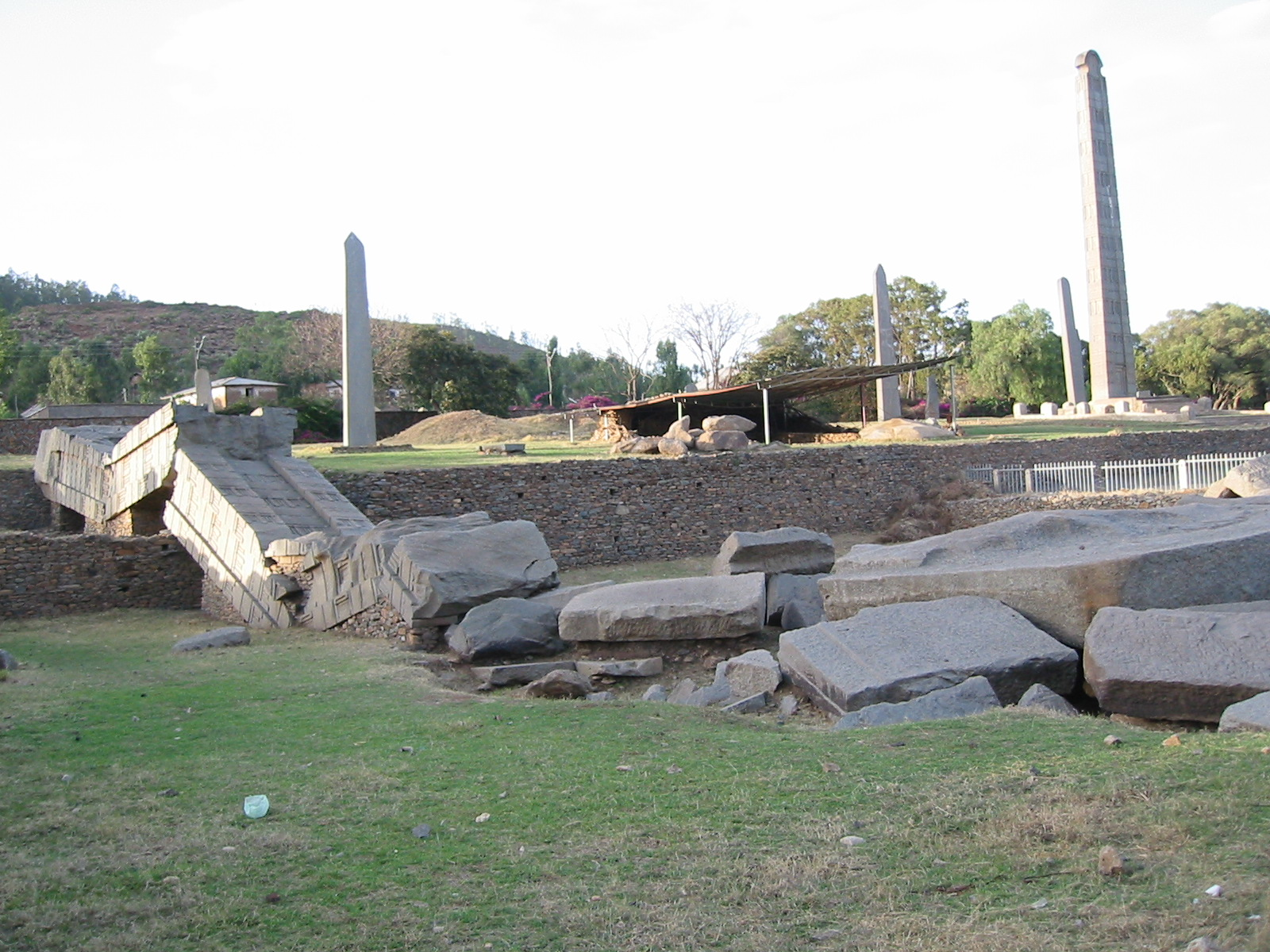
Aksum stelle and ruins

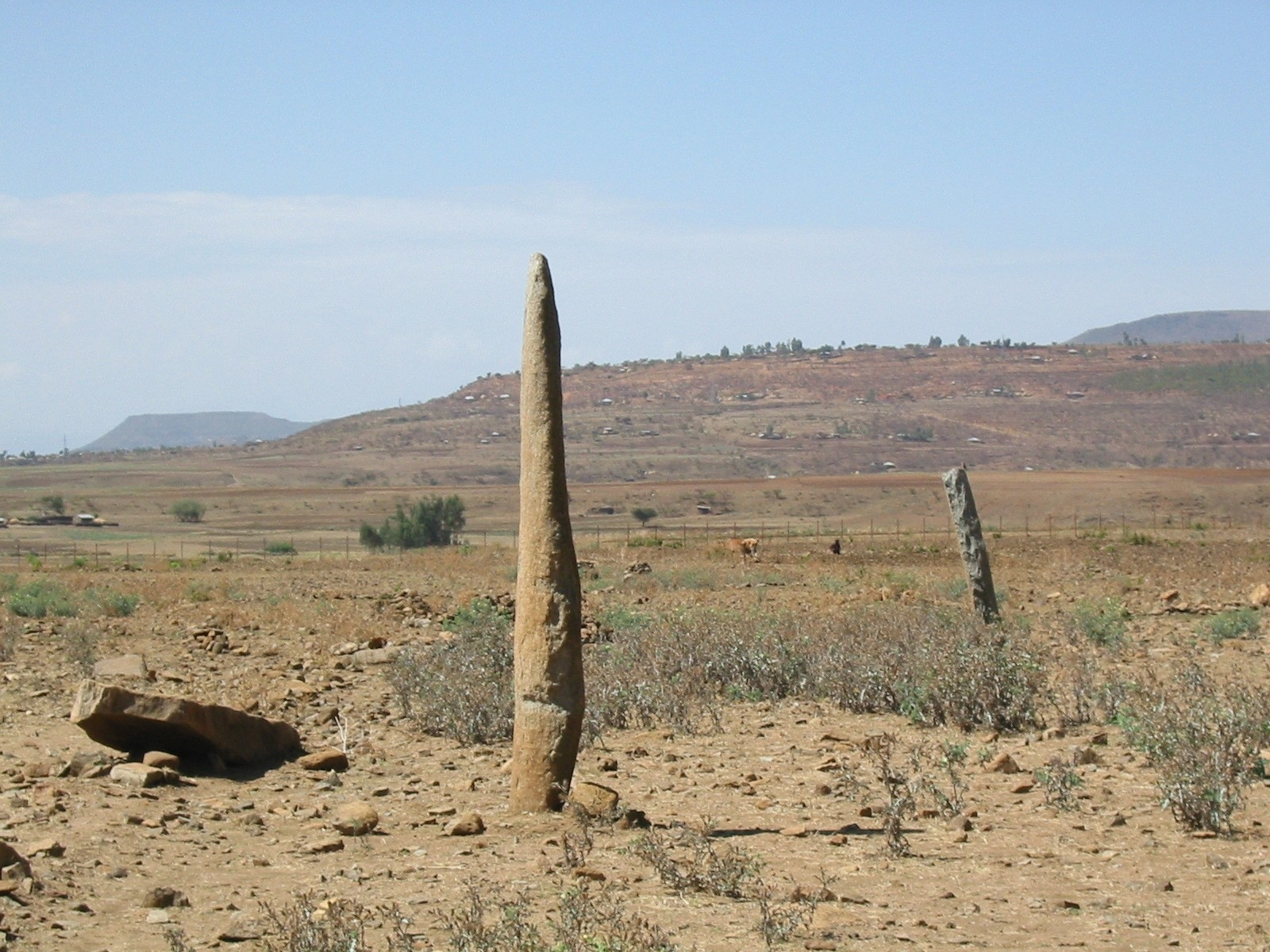
Aksum stelle in desert

== See also ==
- Abraha
- History of Ethiopia
- Mifsas Bahri
- Monumentum Adulitanum
