= Ptolemais Theron =

Greco-Egyptian settlement on the Red Sea coast

Ptolemais Theron (Ancient Greek: Πτολεμαῒς Θηρῶν and Πτολεμαῒς ἡ τῶν θηρῶν) ('Ptolemais of the Hunts') was a marketplace on the African side of the Red Sea, whose location is now uncertain.

According to Strabo (16.4.7), Ptolemais was founded as a base to support the hunting of elephants by a certain Eumedes (Ancient Greek: Εὐμήδης), who had been sent there by Ptolemy II Philadelphus, king of Ptolemaic Egypt. Eumedes, "secretly enclosed a kind of peninsula with a ditch and a wall, and then, by courteous treatment of those who tried to hinder the work, actually won them over as friends instead of foes." (Strabo 16.4.7). Ptolemais was only one of a series of such elephant-hunting stations along the Red Sea coast of Africa, Adulis being perhaps originally another. Pliny the Elder (2.75.1) and Diodorus Siculus (3.41.1) also mention the hunting of the elephants.

The early Ptolemies had seen the value of war elephants by the military strength of the Seleucids. Cut off from any possibility of acquiring Indian elephants, they founded and actively sought to capture them from the neighboring regions of Africa. Although these animals helped in the Battle of Raphia, they proved unstable and the African species were intimidated by the Asian species, which led to the Egyptians eventually abandoning the use of these animals in war.

Unlike most of the stations the Ptolemies established to the south of their kingdom, Ptolemais had enough fertile land immediately around it to sustain it as a town. By the time the Periplus of the Erythraean Sea was written (mid 1st century), it had clearly declined in importance. The writer notes that it had "no harbor, and can only be reached by small boats" (ch. 3).

Ancient authorities are vague on the location of Ptolemais, and the site remains unidentified. The Periplus describes it as 3000 stadia south of the Moskhophagoi, and 3000 stadia north of Adulis, inside the regions ruled by Zoskales, the king of Aksum; Pliny the Elder (N.H. 6.168) notes that Ptolemais was close to Lake Monoleus. G.W.B. Huntingford notes that Ptolemais has been identified both with the locales of Arqiqo and Suakin some 150 miles apart, and notes that Suakin lay at the end of an ancient caravan route that links it to Barbar on the Nile. However, Stanley M. Burstein argues for Trinkitat (18.6788°N, 37.75°E), where he states that "classical architectural fragments" have been found.

Ptolemais Theron is noted by Pliny as a place where shadows vanished under the noontime sun (meaning that the sun reached its zenith) 45 days before and 45 days after midsummer. Pliny claims that this gave Eratosthenes the idea about how to calculate the circumference of the Earth (N.H. 2.183, 6.168).
