= List of state leaders in the 6th century =

This is a list of state leaders in the 6th century (501–600) AD.

== Africa ==
=== Africa: East ===
- Kingdom of Aksum (complete list) –

- Ousas, King (c. 500)
- Kaleb, King (c. 520)
- Alla Amidas, King (fl. mid 6th century)
- Wazena, King (fl. mid 6th century)
- W`ZB, King (fl. mid 6th century)
- Ioel, King (fl. mid 6th century)
- Hataz, King (c. 575)
- Saifu, King (c. 577)
- Israel, King (c. 590)
- Gersem, King (c. 600)

=== Africa: Northcentral ===
- Vandal Kingdom (complete list) –

- Thrasamund, King (496–523)
- Hilderic, King (523–530)
- Gelimer, King (530–534)

== Americas ==
=== Americas: Mesoamerica ===
Maya civilization

- Calakmul (complete list) –

- Yuknoom Chʼeen I, King (early 6th century)
- Tuun Kʼabʼ Hix, King (520–546)
- Sky Witness, King (561–572)
- Yax Yopaat, King (572–579)
- Scroll Serpent, King (579–611)

- Copán (complete list) –

- Bʼalam Nehn, King (504–544)
- Wil Ohl Kʼinich, King (532–551)
- Sak-Lu, King (551–553)
- Tzi-Bʼalam, King (553–578)
- Kʼakʼ Chan Yopaat, King (578–628)

- Palenque (complete list) –

- Bʼutz Aj Sak Chiik, Ajaw (487–501)
- Ahkal Moʼ Nahb I, Ajaw (501–524)
- Kʼan Joy Chitam I, Ajaw (529–565)
- Ahkal Moʼ Nahb II, Ajaw (565–570)
- Kan Bahlam I, Ajaw (572–583)
- Yohl Ikʼnal, Queen (583–604)

- Tikal (complete list) –

- Chak Tok Ichʼaak II, Ajaw (c.486–508)
- Lady of Tikal, Ajaw, co-ruler (511–c.527)
- Kaloomteʼ Bahlam, Ajaw, co-ruler (c.511–527)
- Bird Claw, Ajaw (early 6th century)
- Wak Chan Kʼawiil, Ajaw (c.537–c.562)
- Animal Skull, Ajaw (post-562–c.593)

== Asia ==
=== Asia: Central ===
- Hephthalite Empire –

- Toramana, Tegin (c.490–515)
- Mihirakula, Tegin (c.502–530)

- Rouran Khaganate (complete list) –

- Yujiulü Nagai, Khan (492–506)
- Yujiulü Futu, Khan (506–508)
- Yujiulü Chounu, Khan (508–520)
- Yujiulü Anagui, Khan (520–552)
- Yujiulü Poluomen, Khan (521–524)
- Yujiulü Tiefa, Khan (552–553)
- Yujiulü Dengzhu, Khan (553)
- Yujiulü Kangti, Khan (553)
- Yujiulü Anluochen, Khan (553–554)
- Yujiulü Dengshuzi, Khan (555)

- First Turkic Khaganate (complete list) –

- Bumin, Qaghan (551–552)
- Issik, Qaghan (552–553)
- Muqan, Qaghan (554–572)
- Taspar, Qaghan (572–581)
- Ashina Anluo, Qaghan (581–c.582)
- Ishbara, Qaghan (581–587)
- Bagha, Qaghan (587–589)
- Tulan, Qaghan (588–599)

- Tibet (Yarlung Valley) (complete list) –

- Drongnyen Deu, King (?)
- Tagbu Nyasig, King (579–619)

- Gaochang

- Mǎ Rú, ruler (496-501)
- Qú Jiā, ruler (501-525)
- Qú Guāng, ruler (525-530)
- Qú Jiān, ruler (530-548)
- Qú Xuánxǐ, ruler (549-550)
- unnamed son of Qu Xuanxi, ruler (551-554)
- Qú Bǎomào, ruler (555-560)
- Qú Qiángù, ruler (560-601)

=== Asia: East ===
China: Northern dynasties

- Northern Wei (complete list) –

- Xuanwu, Emperor (499–515)
- Xiaoming, Emperor (516–528)
- daughter of Xiaoming, Emperor (528)
- Yuan Zhao, "Emperor" (528)
- Xiaozhuang, Emperor (528–530)
- Yuan Ye, Emperor (530–531)
- Jiemin, Emperor (531–532)
- Yuan Lang, Emperor (531–532)
- Xiaowu, Emperor (532–535)

- Western Wei (complete list) –

- Wen, Emperor (535–551)
- Fei, Emperor (552–554)
- Gong, Emperor (554–556)

- Northern Zhou (complete list) –

- Xiaomin, Emperor (557)
- Ming, Emperor (557–560)
- Wu, Emperor (561–578)
- Jing, Emperor (579–581)

- Eastern Wei (complete list) –

- Xiaojing, Emperor (534–550)

- Northern Qi (complete list) –

- Wenxuan, Emperor (550–559)
- Fei, Emperor (560)
- Xiaozhao, Emperor (560–561)
- Wucheng, Emperor (561–565)
- Gao Wei, Emperor (565–577)
- Gao Heng, Emperor (577)

China: Southern dynasties

- Southern Qi (complete list) –

- Xiao Baojuan, Emperor (499–501)
- He, Emperor (501–502)

- Southern Liang (complete list) –

- Wu, Emperor (502–549)
- Jianwen, Emperor (549–551)
- Xiao Dong, Prince (551–552)
- Yuan, Emperor (552–555)
- Xiao Yuanming, Marquess (555)
- Jing, Emperor (555–557)

- Western Liang (complete list) –

- Xuan, Emperor (555–562)
- Ming, Emperor (562–585)
- Jing, Emperor (585–587)

- Southern Chen (complete list) –

- Wu, Emperor (557–559)
- Wen, Emperor (560–566)
- Xuan, Emperor (569–582)
- Chen Shubao, Emperor/Duke (582–589)

China: Sui dynasty

- Sui dynasty (complete list) –

- Wen, Emperor (581–604)

Japan

- Japan, Asuka period (complete list) –

- Buretsu, Emperor (498–506)
- Keitai, Emperor (507–531)
- Ankan, Emperor (531–535)
- Senka, Emperor (535–539)
- Kinmei, Emperor (539–571)
- Bidatsu, Emperor (572–585)
- Yōmei, Emperor (585–587)
- Sushun, Emperor (587–592)
- Suiko, Empress (592–628)

Korea

- Baekje (complete list) –

- Dongseong, King (479–501)
- Muryeong, King (501–523)
- Seong, King (523–554)
- Wideok, King (554–598)
- Hye, King (598–599)
- Beop, King (599–600)
- Mu, King (600–641)

- Geumgwan Gaya (complete list) –

- Gyeomji, King (492–521)
- Guhyeong, King (521–532)

- Goguryeo (complete list) –

- Munja, King (491–519)
- Anjang, King (519–531)
- An-won, King (531–545)
- Yang-won, King (545–559)
- Pyeong-won, King (559–590)
- Yeong-yang, King (590–618)

- Silla (complete list) –

- Jijeung, King (500–514)
- Beopheung, King (514–540)
- Jinheung, King (540–576)
- Jinji, King (576–579)
- Jinpyeong, King (579–632)

=== Asia: Southeast ===
Cambodia

- Funan (complete list) –

- Qiáochénrú Shéyébámó, King (484–514)
- Rudravarman, King (514–c.545)

- Chenla (complete list) –

- Bhavavarman I, King (c.550-590)
- Mohendravarman, King (c.590–611)

Indonesia

Indonesia: Java

- Tarumanagara (complete list) –

- Indrawarman, King (455–515)
- Candrawarman, King (515–535)
- Suryawarman, King (535–561)
- Kertawarman, King (561–628)

Indonesia: Sumatra

- Kantoli –

- Vijayavarman, King (c.519)

Malaysia: Peninsular

- Kedah Sultanate (complete list) –

- Karna DiMaharaja, Maharaja (c.465–512)
- Karma, Maharaja (c.512–580)
- Maha Dewa II, Maharaja (c.580–620)

Vietnam

- Champa (complete list) –

- Fan Wenkuan, King (c.502–c.510)
- Devavarman, King (c.510–c.526)
- Vijayavarman, King (c.526–c.529)
- Rudravarman I, King (c.529)
- Sambuvarman, King (mid 6th century)

- Early Lý dynasty (complete list) –

- Lý Nam Đế, Emperor (544–548)
- Triệu Việt Vương, Emperor (548–571)
- Đào Lang Vương, Emperor (549–555)
- Hậu Lý Nam Đế, Emperor (571–603)

=== Asia: South ===
Bengal and Northeast India

- Gauda Kingdom (complete list) –

- Shashanka, King (c.590–625)

- Kamarupa: Varman dynasty (complete list) –

- Narayanavarman, King (494–518)
- Bhutivarman, King (518–542)
- Chandramukhavarman, King (542–566)
- Sthitavarman, King (566–590)
- Susthitavarman, King (590–595)
- Supratisthitavarman, King (595–600)
- Bhaskaravarman, King (600–650)

India

- Chahamanas of Shakambhari (complete list) –

- Vasu-deva, King (6th century)

- Chalukya dynasty (complete list) –

- Jayasimha, King (c.500–c.520)
- Ranaraga, King (c.520–c.540)
- Pulakeshin I, King (c.540–c.567)
- Kirttivarman I, King (c.567–c.592)
- Mangalesha, King (c.592–c.610)

- Eastern Ganga dynasty (complete list) –

- Indravarman I, King (496–535)
- Samantavarman, King (537–562)
- Hastivarman, King (562–578)
- Indravarman II, King (578–589)
- Danarnava, King (589–652)
- Indravarman III, King (589–652)

- Western Ganga dynasty (complete list) –

- Avinita, King (469–529)
- Durvinita, King (529–579)
- Mushkara, King (579–604)

- Gupta Empire (complete list) –

- Narasimhagupta Baladitya, Emperor (c.495–?)
- Kumaragupta III, Emperor
- Vishnugupta, Emperor (c.540–c.550)
- Vainyagupta, Emperor (c.551–c.554)
- Bhanugupta, Emperor (c.510–?)

- Kadamba dynasty: Banavasi branch (complete list) –

- Ravivarma, Maharaja (485–519)
- Harivarma, Maharaja (519–530)

- Kadamba dynasty: Triparvatha branch (complete list) –

- Simhavarma, Maharaja (485–516)
- Krishna Varma II, Maharaja (516–540)

- Maitraka dynasty (complete list) –

- Dronasinha, Maharaja (c.500–c.520)
- Dhruvasena I, Maharaja (c.520–c.550)
- Dharapatta, Maharaja (c.550–c.556)
- Gruhasena, Maharaja(dhiraja) (c.556–c.570)
- Dharasena II, Maharaja (c.570–c.595)
- Śīlāditya I, Maharaja (c.595–c.615)

- Maukhari dynasty (complete list) –

- Ishana-varman, King (c.550–560)
- Sharva-varman, King (c.560–575)
- Avanti-varman, King (c.575–600)
- Graha-varman, King (c.600–605)

- Pallava dynasty –

- The Pallava dynasty has two chronologies of rulers.
- Nandivarman I, King (480–500/510)
- Kumaravishnu II, King (early 6th century)
- Buddhavarman, King (early 6th century)
- Kumaravishnu III, King (early 6th century)
- Simhavarman III, King (early/mid 6th century)
- Simhavishnu, King (mid/late 6th century)
- Mahendravarman I, King (6th/7th century)

- Pandyan dynasty (complete list) –

- Kadungon, King (590–620)

- Pushyabhuti dynasty (complete list) –

- Naravardhana, King (c.500–525)
- Rajyavardana, King (c.525–555)
- Adityavardhana, King (c.555–580)
- Prabhakara-vardhana, King (c.580–605)

- Vishnukundina dynasty (complete list) –

- Vikramendra Varma I, Maharaja (c.508–528)
- Vikramendra Varma II, Maharaja (555–569)
- Janssraya Madhava Varma IV, Maharaja (573–621)

Sri Lanka

- Anuradhapura Kingdom, Sri Lanka (complete list) –

- Moggallana I, King (497–515)
- Kumara Dhatusena, King (515–524)
- Kittisena, King (524–524)
- Siva II, King (524–525)
- Upatissa II, King (525–526)
- Silakala Ambosamanera, King (526–539)
- Dathappabhuti, King (539–540)
- Moggallana II, King (540–560)
- Kittisiri Meghavanna, King (560–561)
- Maha Naga, King (561–564)
- Aggabodhi I, King (564–598)
- Aggabodhi II, King (598–608)

=== Asia: West ===
Turks

- Western Turkic Khaganate (complete list) –

- Istämi, Yabgu (553–575)
- Tardu

- Yabgu (575–581)
- Qaghan (581–603)

- Apa, Qaghan of the Apa line (581–587)
- Niri, Qaghan of the Apa line (c.600)

Persia

- Persia: Sasanian Empire (complete list) –

- Kavadh I, Shahanshah, King of Kings (498–496, 499–531)
- Khosrow I, Shahanshah, King of Kings (531–579)
- Hormizd IV, Shahanshah, King of Kings (579–590)
- Khosrow II, Shahanshah, King of Kings (590)
- Bahram VI Chobin,§ Shahanshah, King of Kings (590–591)
- Khosrow II, Shahanshah, King of Kings (591–628)
- Vistahm,§ Shahanshah, King of Kings (591–596)

Arabia

- Lakhmid kingdom

- al-Nu'man II ibn al-Aswad (497–503)
- Abu Ya'fur ibn Alqama (503–505)
- al-Mundhir III ibn al-Nu'man (503/5–554)
- 'Amr III ibn al-Mundhir (554–569)
- Qabus ibn al-Mundhir (569–573)
- Suhrab (Persian governor) (573–574)
- al-Mundhir IV ibn al-Mundhir (574–580)
- al-Nu'man III ibn al-Mundhir (580–602)

== Europe ==
=== Europe: Balkans ===
- Byzantine Empire (complete list) –

- Anastasius I, Emperor (491–518)
- Justin I, Emperor (518–527)
- Justinian I, Emperor (527–565)
- Justin II, Emperor (565–578)
- Tiberius II, Emperor (578–582)
- Maurice, Emperor (582–602)
- Theodosius, Co-Emperor (590–602)

=== Europe: British Isles ===
Great Britain: Scotland

- Dál Riata (complete list) –

- Loarn, King (474–500)
- Fergus Mór, King (500–501)
- Domangart Réti, King (?–c.507)
- Comgall mac Domangairt, King (?–c.540)
- Gabrán mac Domangairt, King (?–c.560)
- Conall mac Comgaill, King (?–c.574)
- Áedán mac Gabráin, King (?–c.606)

- Picts (complete list) –

- Galam Cennalath, King (550–555)
- Bridei I, King (554–584)
- Gartnait II, King (584–595)
- Nechtan nepos Uerb, King (595–616)

- Kingdom of Strathclyde / Alt Clut (complete list) –

- Dyfnwal Hen, King (early 6th century)
- Clinoch of Alt Clut, King (6th century)
- Tutagual, King (mid 6th century)
- Rhydderch Hael, King (6th–7th century)

- Isle of Man (complete list) –

- Sennylt Hael, King (c.550)
- Neithon, King (c.575)

Great Britain: Northumbria

- Bernicia (complete list) –

- Ida, King (c.547–559)
- Glappa, King (559–560)
- Adda, King of Bernicia (560–568)
- Aethelric, King (568–572)
- Theodric, King (572–579)
- Frithuwald, King (579–585)
- Hussa, King (585–592)
- Æthelfrith, King (593–616)

- Deira (complete list) –

- Ælla, King (560–589)
- Aethelric, King (589–604)

Great Britain: England

- The Britons (complete list) –

- Ambrosius Aurelianus, Leader (late 5th century)
- Maelgwn Gwynedd, King (?–c.549)
- Selyf ap Cynan, King (?–c.613)

- Dumnonia (complete list) –

- Geraint, King (c.480–c.514)
- Cador, King (c.514–c.530)
- Constantine, King (c.530–c.560)
- Gerren rac Denau, King (c.560–c.598)
- Bledric ap Custennin, King (c.598–c.613)

- Kingdom of East Anglia (complete list) –

- Wehha, King (?–571)
- Wuffa of East Anglia, King (571–578)
- Tytila of East Anglia, King (578–593)
- Raedwald of East Anglia, King (593–624)

- Kingdom of Essex (complete list) –

- Æscwine, King (527–587)
- Sledd, King (587–604)

- Kingdom of Kent (complete list) –

- Oisc, King (488–c.512)
- Octa, King (512/516–534/540)
- Eormenric, King (534/540–c.590)
- Æthelberht I, King (c.590–616)

- Kingdom of Sussex (complete list) –

- Ælle, King (477–514)
- Cissa, King (514–567)

- Kingdom of Wessex (complete list) –

- Cerdic, King (519–534)
- Cynric, King (534–560)
- Ceawlin, King (560–592)
- Cynric, King (534–560)
- Ceol, King (591–597)
- Ceolwulf, King (597–611)

Great Britain: Wales

- Kingdom of Ceredigion –

- Serwyl ap Usai, King (490–523)
- Boddw ap Serwyl, King (523–560)
- Arthfoddw ap Boddw, King (560–595)
- Arthlwys ap Arthwfoddw, King (595–630)

- Kingdom of Glywysing (complete list) –

- Cadoc, ruler of Gwynllwg (523–580) ruler of Penychen (540–580)

- Kingdom of Gwynedd (complete list) –

- Cadwallon Lawhir, King (c.500–534)
- Maelgwn Gwynedd, King (c.520–c.547)
- Rhun ap Maelgwn, King (c.547–c.580)
- Beli ap Rhun, King (c.580–c.599)
- Iago ap Beli, King (c.599–c.616)

- Kingdom of Gwent (complete list) –

- Meurig ap Tewdrig, King (493/517–530–540)

- Kingdom of Powys (complete list) –

- Cyngen Glodrydd, King (c.500)
- Pasgen ap Cyngen, King (c.530)
- Morgan ap Pasgen, King (c.540)
- Brochwel Ysgithrog, King (c.550)
- Cynan Garwyn, King (582–610)

Ireland

- Ireland (complete list) –

These kings are generally though historical, but dates are uncertain and naming some High Kings may be anachronistic or inaccurate.
- Lugaid mac Lóegairi, High King (479–503)
- Muirchertach mac Ercae, High King (504–527)
- Túathal Máelgarb, High King (528–538
- Diarmait mac Cerbaill, High King (539–558)
- Domhnall and Fearghus, High Kings (559–561)
- Eochaidh and Baedan, High Kings (562–563)
- Ainmuire mac Sétnai, High King (564–566)
- Báetán mac Ninnedo, High King (567)
- Áed mac Ainmuirech, High King (568–594)
- Áed Sláine and Colmán Rímid, High King (595–600)

- Airgíalla (complete list) –

- Colga mac Loite mac Cruinn, King (?–513)
- Cairpre Daim Argat, King (?–514)
- Daimine Daim Argat, King (?–565)
- Conall Derg mac Daimine)
- Bec mac Cuanu, King (?–594)
- Aed mac Colgan, King (?–606)

=== Europe: Central ===
- Duchy of Alsace (see also) –

- Butilin, Duke (539–554)
- Leuthari I, Duke (pre-552–554)
- Haming, Duke (539–554)
- Lantachar, Duke (?–548)
- Magnachar, Duke (555–565)
- Vaefar, Duke (565–573)
- Theodefrid, Duke (fl.573)
- Leutfred, Duke (570–587)
- Uncilin, Duke (587–607)

- Bavaria (complete list) –

- Garibald I, Duke (555–591)
- Tassilo I, Duke (591–610)

- Old Saxony (complete list) –

- Hadugato, Duke (fl.531)

- Thuringia (complete list) –

- Baderich, King (500–530)
- Berthachar, King (500–530)
- Herminafried, King (500–531)

=== Europe: East ===
- Avar Khaganate –

- Kandik, Khagan (554–562)
- Bayan I, Khagan (562–602)

- Kingdom of the Gepids

- Thraustila, fl. 488
- Thrasaric, fl. 505
- Elemund, ?–548
- Thurisind, 548–c.560
- Cunimund, c.560–567

=== Europe: Nordic ===
- Sweden (complete list) –

- Ongentheow, King (c.490–515)
- Ohthere, King
- Onela, King
- Eadgils, King (c.530–575)
- Östen, King (late 6th century)
- Sölve, King (late 6th–early 7th century)

=== Europe: Southcentral ===
- Lombards in Pannonia (complete list) –

- Tato, King (c.500–510)
- Wacho, King (510–539)
- Walthari, King (539–546)
- Audoin, King (546–560)
- Alboin, King (560–568)

- Kingdom of the Lombards in Italy (complete list) –

- Alboin, King (568–572)
- Cleph, King (572–574)
- Rule of the Dukes (574–584)
- Authari, King (584–590)
- Agilulf, King (590–616)

- Kingdom of the Ostrogoths in Italy (complete list) –

- Theodoric, King (493–526)
- Athalaric, King (526–534)
- Theodahad, King (534–536)
- Vitiges, King (536–540)
- Ildibad, King (540–541)
- Eraric, King (541)
- Totila, King (541–552)
- Teia, King (552–553)

- Duchy of Spoleto (complete list) –

- Faroald I, Duke (570–592)
- Ariulf, Duke (592–602)

=== Europe: Southwest ===
- Kingdom of Galicia / Kingdom of the Suebi (complete list) –

- Veremund, King (fl. 535)
- Theodemund, King (fl. 6th century)
- Chararic, King (c.550–558/559)
- Ariamir, King (558/559–561/566)
- Theodemar, King (561/566–570)
- Miro, King (570–583)
- Eboric, King (583–584)
- Andeca, King (584–585)
- Malaric, King (585)

- Visigothic Kingdom (complete list) –

- Alaric II, King (484–507)
- Gesalec, King (507–511)
- Theoderic the Great, Regent (511–526)
- Amalaric, King (526–531)
- Theudis, King (531–548)
- Theudigisel, King (548–549)
- Agila I, King (549–554)
- Athanagild, King (554–568)
- Liuva I, King (568–572)
- Liuvigild, King (569–586)
- Hermenegild, King (580–585)
- Reccared I, King (580–601)
- Segga, King (586–587)
- Argimund, King (589–590)

=== Europe: West ===
- Austrasia of the Franks (complete list) –

- Theuderic I, King (511–533)
- Theudebert I, King (533–548)
- Theudebald, King (548–555)
- Chlothar I, King (555–561)
- Sigebert I, King (561–575)
- Childebert II, King (575–595)
- Theudebert II, King (595–612)

- Kingdom of the Burgundians (non-Merovingian) (complete list) –

- Gundobad, King in Lyon and Burgundy (473–516)
- Godegisel, King in Vienne and Geneva (473–500)
- Sigismund, King (516–523)
- Godomar, King (523–532)

- Kingdom of Burgundy (Merovingian) (complete list) -

- Guntram, King (561–592)
- Childebert II, King (592–595), also King of Austrasia
- Theuderic II, King (595–613), also King of Austrasia

- Champagne (complete list) –

- Lupus, Duke (570s)

- Frankish Empire: Merovingian dynasty (complete list) –

- Clovis I, King (481–511)
- Childebert I, King (511–558)
- Chlodomer, King (511–524)
- Theuderic I, King (511–533)
- Theudebert I, King (533–548)
- Theudebald, King (548–555)
- Chlothar I, King (511–561)
- Charibert I, King (561–567)
- Guntram, King (561–592)
- Sigebert I, King (561–575)
- Childebert II, King (575–595)
- Theudebert II, King (595–612)

=== Eurasia: Caucasus ===
- Kingdom of Abkhazia (complete list) –

- Anos, King (c.510–530)
- Ghozar, King (c.530–550)
- Istvine, King (c.550–580)
- Phinictios, King (c.580–610)

- Kingdom of Iberia (Kartli) (complete list) –

- Vakhtang I Gorgasali, King (447–522)
- Dachi, King (522–534)
- Bacurius II, King (534–547)
- Pharasmanes V, King (547–561)
- Pharasmanes VI, King (561–?)
- Bacurius III, King (?–580)
