= Ioel =

King of Aksum from 580 to c. 585

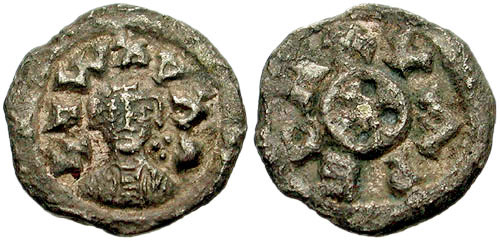

King of Aksum
- Reign: 580-c.585
- Predecessor: WʽZB
- Successor: Hataz

Ioel, or Joel (mid 6th century), was a king of the Kingdom of Aksum. He is primarily known through the coins that were minted during his reign. He is one of several Aksumite kings with a Biblical name, the others include Israel, Kaleb, and likely Gersem and Noe; Ioel is named for the Biblical prophet, Joel, author of the Book of Joel.

Based on the typology and quality of metal in his coins, Ioel's reign has been dated firmly after the reign of Kaleb, although authorities differ exactly what order he ruled: Stuart Munro-Hay first dated his reign between Alla Amidas and Wazena, but later between WʽZB and Hataz; while Wolfgang Hahn and Vincent West place him between Gersem and Hataz.

== Coinage ==
Coins were issued during Ioel's reign in three metals: gold, silver, and copper. They have been categorized into eight types, comprising two types of gold coins, two of silver, and four of copper. Munro-Hay notes that the gold content in those coins are so debased that they could not have been "issued for anything other than prestige, since they could not have been acceptable as gold pieces." The gold types, like most of his fellow Aksumite kings, are characterized by busts of the ruler on both sides, with stalks of barley on either side. The silver types are markedly different, with one silver type similar to the gold types, and the other having a different design on the reverse: words in Greek meaning "By the Grace of Ch[rist]". The second silver type is also the only bilingual coin issued by the kings of Aksum. While all four of the copper types have a frontal bust or profile of Ioel on the obverse, the reverse sides of three are characterized by crosses while the fourth shows Ioel in profile holding a cross in his hand.
