= Armah =

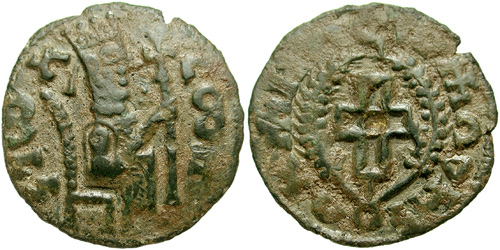

King of Aksum

Armah (late 6th/early 7th century AD) was a king of the Aksum. He is primarily known through the coins that were minted during his reign. While some scholars have suggested as long ago as 1895 that he was identical to Najashi, the king of Axum who gave shelter to Muslim emigrants around 615-6, more recently Wolfgang Hahn has suggested Armah might have been the name of one of the sons of Kaleb, Alla Amidas.

Stuart Munro-Hay states that either Armah or Gersem were the last Axumite kings to issue coins. However, Wolfgang Hahn holds that Hataz was the latest king to coin currency, pointing to the low purity of silver in his coins. In any case, the typology and quality of metal in the silver issue confirms Armah ruled after Kaleb.

== Coinage ==
Armah's name only appears on silver and copper coins; one type of each has been identified. The absence of an issue of gold coins is one of the reasons Hahn believes he is identical with Alla Amidas, whose only known coins were in gold. The silver types bear an unusual reverse, showing a structure with three crosses, the middle one gilded. Munro-Hay quotes Wolfgang Hahn as suggesting that this is an allusion to the Holy Sepulchre, as a reference to the Persian capture of Jerusalem in 614; if this is correct, it provides a date for Armah. The legend on the obverse reads "King Armah" in Ge'ez; the reverse reads "Mercy and Peace." Munro-Hay further notes that the reverse of this silver issue is quite similar to the reverse of an anonymous issue of silver coins; the ruler associated with that issue identified himself as simply "The king who exalts the Savior".

The copper type is known in two versions, the difference being the cross on the reverse has a gold inlay in the center of the cross. The obverse shows Armah seated on a throne with a high back; the reverse is distinguished by a cross with barley stalks on either side, attached to the cross at the base. Both inscriptions on the copper issue are also in Ge'ez: the legend on the obverse reads "King Armah", while the legend on the reverse is "Joy and peace to the people."
