= Aksumite currency =

Coinage produced and used in the Kingdom of Aksum

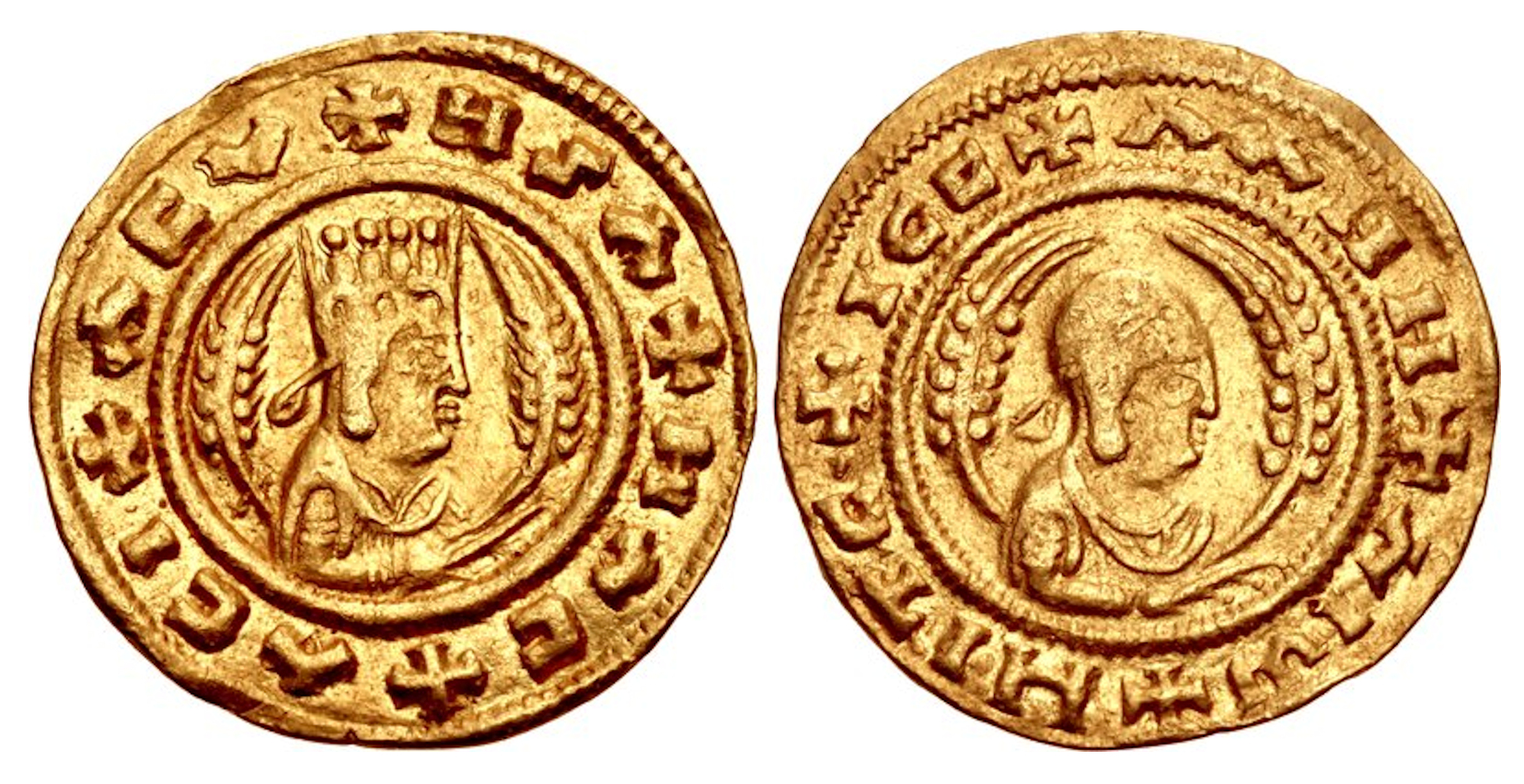
4th-century gold coin of King Ezana.

Aksumite currency was coinage produced and used within the Kingdom of Aksum (or Axum) centered in present-day Ethiopia and Eritrea and Yemen. Its mintages were issued and circulated from the reign of King Endybis around AD 270 until it began its decline in the first half of the 7th century where they started using Dinar along with most parts of the Middle East. During the succeeding medieval period, Mogadishu currency, minted by the Sultanate of Mogadishu, was the most widely circulated currency in the eastern and southern parts of the Horn of Africa from the beginning of the 12th century.

Aksum's currency serves as an indicator of the kingdom's contemporary cultural influences and religious climate (first polytheistic and later Oriental Christianity). It also facilitated the Red Sea trade on which it thrived. The coinage has also proved invaluable in providing a reliable chronology of Aksumite kings due to the lack of extensive archaeological work in the area.

== Origins ==
=== Pre-coinage period ===
Though the issuing of minted coins didn't begin until around 270, metal coins may have been used in Aksum centuries prior to centralized minting. The Periplus of the Erythraean Sea mentions that the Aksumite state imported brass (Ancient Greek: ὀρείχαλκος, oreíkhalkos), "which they use[d] for ornaments and for cutting as money", and they imported "a little money (denarion) for [use by] foreigners who live there." It can be inferred, therefore, that early Aksumite kings, located on the international trading waters of the Red Sea, recognized the utility of a standardized currency for facilitating both domestic and international trade.

=== Influences ===
Though Aksumite coins are indigenous in design and creation, some outside influences encouraging the use of coins is undeniable. By the time coins were first minted in Aksum, there was widespread trade with Romans on the Red Sea; Kushana or Persian influence also cannot be ruled out. Roman, Himyarite, and Kushana coins have all been found in major Aksumite cities, however, only very small quantities have been attested and the circulation of foreign currency seems to have been limited. Though South Arabian kingdoms had also minted coins, they had already gone out of use by the time of certain Aksumite involvement in South Arabia under GDRT, and only very rarely produced electrum or gold denominations (silver mainly in Saba' and Himyar, while bronze in Hadhramaut), making influence unlikely. The major impetus, however, was not emulation but economical; the Red Sea and its coasts had always been an international trade area and coins would greatly facilitate trade and wealth in the now "world power." Despite these influences, the coins were of genuinely indigenous design, and foreign influences were relatively weak and few in number.

== Pre-Christian period ==
Aksumite currency were first minted in the later stages of the growth of the empire, when its Golden Age had already begun. The minting of coins began around 270, beginning with the reign of Endybis.

== Source of materials ==
=== Gold ===
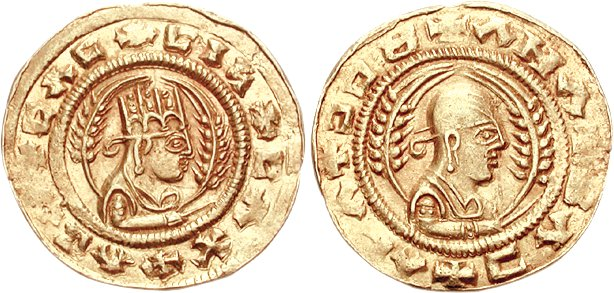
Gold coin of Endybis.

Gold seems to have been acquired from a number of sources. Gold probably came from Sasu (southern Sudan), as well as more nearby Ethiopian sources, though the latter isn't well documented for the north. A gold trade from the southern areas of Ethiopia such as the medieval province/kingdom of Innarya has been attested from the 6th century (i.e. from the writings of Cosmas Indicopleustes) and continued through James Bruce's day (18th century). Ethiopian Trade with modern Zimbabwe for gold was also a source. Gold also came from more northerly sources such as Gojjam, Beja lands, and what is now Eritrea, though the latter two are less certain. However, a recent gold exploration assay in Eritrea has found significant gold deposits at Emba Derho, and deposits are also attested at Zara in central-western Eritrea.

=== Silver and others ===
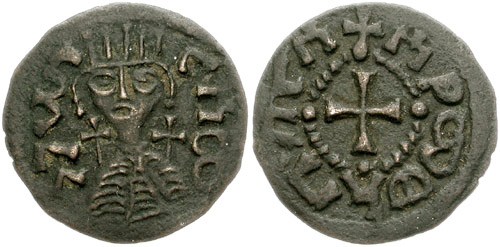
Base coinage with the rare front portrait.

While local sources of gold are attested during the Aksumite era, silver seems to have been rarer in Aksum. No mention of silver mines in the region exist until the 15th and 16th centuries. Though silver was imported as attested by the Periplus of the Erythraean Sea, given the preponderance of silver coins, it could not have been the only source of silver in Aksum. Furthermore, a significant number of the silver coins contain gold inlays (presumably to increase the value), which would have been unnecessary if silver were so rare that it had to be mainly imported. Silver may have been obtained from the refinement of gold, which sometimes occurs naturally with silver in an alloy called electrum. Copper and bronze do not seem to have existed locally in the Aksumite empire, though they were noted as imports in the Periplus of the Erythraean Sea.

== Value ==
Though the gold coins were certainly the most valuable issue, followed by the silver one, the exact relationship between the three issues (gold, silver, and bronze) is not known. The supply of gold was closely controlled by the Aksumite state, as noted by Cosmas Indicopleustes, and other precious metals were undoubtedly also closely controlled, allowing the Aksumite state to ensure the usage of its currency.

The quality of the Aksumite coins were also closely controlled, usually of high purity. For example, the lowest purity of gold recorded thus far for Aphilas is 90 percent. Early issues were often very close to their theoretical weights, and some were even over. However, the weight of the coins tended to decrease over time (though not continuously or uniformly). This may have reflected a desire to conform to the Diocletian monetary reform of 301, when the aureus was decreased from 1/60 of a Roman pound to 1/72. Despite decreases in weight, the purity of the gold was largely maintained, even by later kings. The relative abundance of Aksumite coins as well as the many that have yet to be found indicate that Aksum must have had access to large quantities of gold.

== Design ==
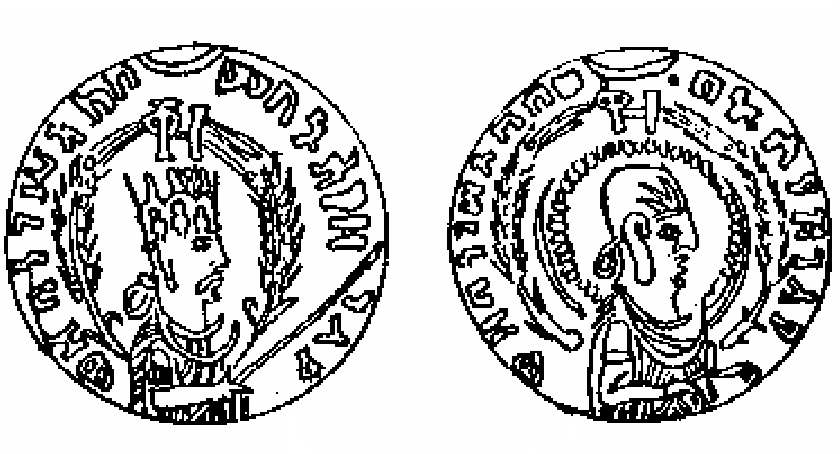
Sketch of gold coin of Wazeba using the Ge'ez script and language.

The coins were often inscribed in Greek, as much of its trade was with the "Graecised Orient." Later inscriptions made more use of Ge'ez, the language of the Aksumites, perhaps indicating a decline in its use for more international trade (i.e. with Rome and India). The obverse of the coins would always feature an image of the king (almost always in profile) wearing either a crown or helmet/regnal headcloth. The headcloth had some image perhaps representing pleats, rays, or sunburst in the front, as well as the tied end of a cloth or fillet to hold the helmet or headcloth in place. Most coins also included an inscription (usually in Greek) meaning "King of Aksum" or King of the Aksumites" (ΑΞΩΜΙΤΩ ΒΑϹΙΛΕΥϹ). However, many coins were also minted anonymously (or even posthumously), especially during the 5th century. Inscriptions on the coins could include a bisi name ("man of," Ge'ez: ብእስየ bə'əsyä) or an epithet (beginning with Əllä, Ge'ez: እለ "he who") in addition to the king's personal name. Bisi names were used more often in conjuncture with personal names on earlier coins, while the epithets were more common in later years, being the only inscribed name in a few sources. Greek text was used in conjunction with Ge'ez script inscriptions, but was the only language used on the gold coins, with the exception of the Ge'ez language coins of Wazeba and MHDYS. Over time, the Greek used on the coins (gold, silver and bronze) deteriorated, indicative of Aksum's decline. Moreover, beginning with MHDYS for bronze coins and Wazeba for silver coins, Ge'ez gradually replaced Greek on the legends.

=== Mottoes ===
Aksumite coins used a number of mottoes throughout the period in which they were minted, beginning in the early 4th century. Around this time, numerous anonymous bronze coins with simply βασιλεύς (basileús, "king") on the obverse were minted by either King Ezana or one of his successors. The coins bore the first example of an Aksumite motto on the reverse, ΤΟΥΤΟΑΡΕΣΗΤΗΧΩΡΑ (τοῦτο ἀρέσῃ τῇ χώρᾳ, toûto arésēi tēî khṓrāi, "may this please the country"). It was later written in unvocalized Ge'ez as ለሐዘበ ፡ ዘየደአ LʾḤZB ZYDʾ and under King Kaleb also ለሀገረ ፡ ዘየደአ LHGR ZYDʾ, "may this please the city [country]." Similar mottoes were used by other kings. Coins of the early 7th-century Emperor Armah had inscribed on the back ፈሰሐ ፡ ለየከነ ፡ ለአዘሐበ FŚḤ LYKN LʾḤZB (vocalization: ፍሥሓ ፡ ለይኲን ፡ ለአሕዛብ ፡ fiśśiḥā la-yikʷin la-'aḥzāb, "Let the people be glad," lit. "Gladness let there be to the peoples").

== Kings ==
Coins were made in the name of eighteen Aksumite kings from c. 295 until c. 620: Endybis, Aphilas, Ousanas I, WZB, Ezana, Ouazebas, Eon, MHDYS, Ebana, Nezana, Ousanas II, Kaleb, Armah, Ella Gabaz, Israel, Gersem, Joel, and Hethasas.

=== Endybis ===
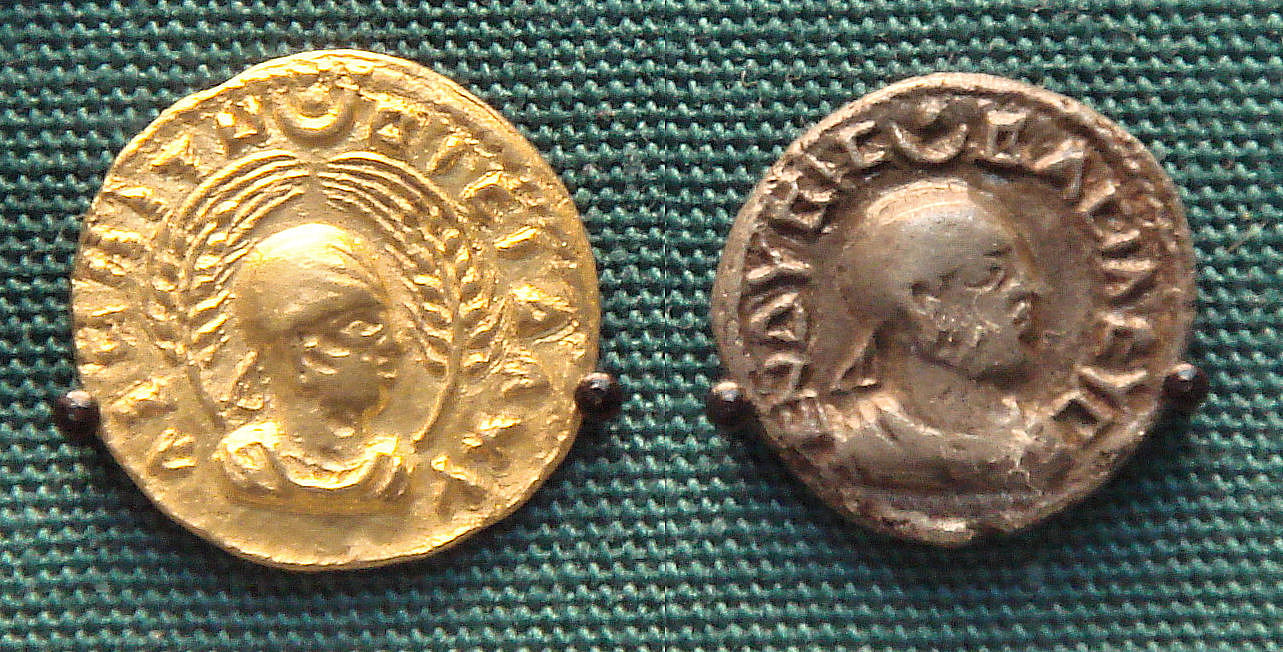
Coins of king Endybis, 227–235 AD, with Greek inscriptions. The left one reads ΑΞΩΜΙΤΩ ΒΑϹΙΛΕΥϹ, "King of Axum", and the right one ΕΝΔΥΒΙϹ ΒΑϹΙΛΕΥϹ, "King Endybis".

Endybis, the first known Aksumite king to mint coins, focused almost entirely on his image on both the obverse and reverse. The images were of his head and upper half of his chest in profile, wearing a regnal headcloth or helmet and abundant jewelry. In addition to inscribing his regnal name, Endybis also noted his bisi name, a practice continued by his early successors, but often missing in later coins. The bisi name was a sort of tribal affiliation or "ethnikon" (i.e. a reference to the king's lineage) that was different for every king. Endybis also emphasized his religion through the pre-Christian symbol of the disk and crescent as a propaganda method (a purpose which the coins already served). A second motif used by Enybis and continued by following coins was that of two (though sometimes one in later years) ears of barley or wheat around the image of his head in profile. Though no inscriptional evidence exists, given its prominent position around the image of the king, the two ears of barley (or wheat) may have been representative symbols of the Aksumite state. Though later coins would be smaller, Endybis chose the Roman aureus to standardize Aksumite coin weights against, with gold issues at half-aureus around 2.70 grams (more precisely, the theoretical weight may have been 2.725g).

=== Aphilas ===
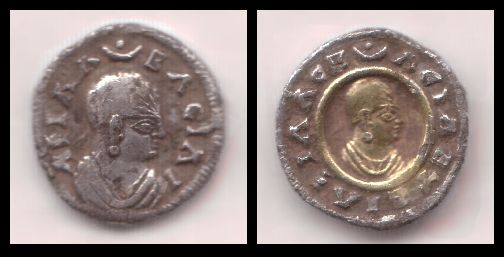
Silver coin of Aphilas with gold inlay.

Whereas all of Endybis' coins feature the king with a headcloth or helmet, Aphilas's coins show the king wearing an impressive high crown on top of the headcloth. The crown featured colonnades of arches supporting high spikes, on top of which rested large discs of unidentified composition. In addition to the crown and headcloth, Aphilas's coins included further images of regalia, such as a spear, a branch with berries, the depiction of the arms, the addition of tassels with fringes to the imperial robe, and more jewelry, such as amulets and bracelets. Despite this innovation, Aphilas continued to use the image of himself in the regnal headcloth in some coins, sometimes as the reverse, while his crowned image is only found on the obverse.

One of his issues included his frontal image on the obverse, which ended with his reign and was only revived by the late kings. Two other minting features of Aphilas were also abandoned by later rulers. One of these was the use of just the inscription "King Aphilas" as the reverse of a coin, the only purely epigraphical side ever used on an Aksumite coin. The other was his use of a single ear of barley or wheat as a reverse, though his use of two ears circling around the king's image continued.

Aphilas introduced a number of different standards for all three metals, some of which lasted through to the 7th century, while the use of others ended with his reign. His new gold coins (issued in conjunction with the older) of a quarter aureus and eighth aureus were soon abandoned (each are known from only one specimen), and 1/16 aureus coins have been found, though these are more likely to be deliberate debasements to increase profit (Aksumite gold was generally very pure, however). Aphilas's silver coin, however, issued at half the weight of the former, became the new Aksumite standard for silver up until the end of coinage. The older coin was presumably more valuable than needed, and the new coin remedied the problem. Aphilas's bronze issue, however, was instead doubled to 4.83 grams. The coin's rarity may attest to its quick withdrawal from the market, as is assumed with his quarter-aureus. These two issues are the only one of Aphilas's issues to portray him frontally, rather than in profile.

=== Ezana ===
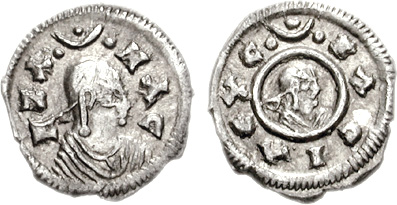
Silver coin of Ezana.

During Ezana's reign a major change in both the Aksumite kingdom and its coinage took place as a result of the change of the official religion to Christianity, one of the first states ever to do so. While Ezana's coins in the first half of his reign are almost identical to those of Aphilas, barring minimal weight reductions, those of his second half employ revolutionary designs. With his conversion to Christianity, Ezana began to feature the Cross on his coins, the first time the Christian cross had ever been featured in coinage in the world. Some of his gold Christian coins are of the weight before Constantine I's weight reform in 324, indicating a conversion before this date or perhaps a few years after, as the Aksumite coinage may not have changed weights immediately. Along with the adoption of the Cross on his coins came, of course, the abandonment of the star and crescent symbol on the coins. Later Christian coins reflect the adoptment of the 4.54 g standard by Constantine, with theoretical weights in Aksumite coins likewise dropping to 1.70 g for the gold coins.

Coins of Ezana without any symbol at all have also been found, along with similar symbolless coins of his father, Ousanas. These may reflect a transition in the religion in Aksum when Frumentius was influencing Ezana's father and gathering Christians in the country, giving weight to the writings of Rufinus. The lack of symbol altogether may reflect an uncertainty as how best to exhibit the change in religion of the Aksumite state.

== Weight standards ==
=== Gold coins ===
The gold coin weighed on average 2.5-2.8 grams and was 15–21 mm in diameter at the start of issue, in 270-300. This would make it half an Aureus which weighed 4.62-6.51 grams at the time of Probus. The issue of Israel (570-600) weighed 1.5 grams and was 17 mm in diameter. The Roman solidus of Maurice Tiberius was 4.36-4.47 grams. A majority of these coins were found in South Arabia and not Aksum. The name is unknown so it is referred to as an AU Unit.

=== Silver coinage ===
Also starting with Endybis these coins were 2.11-2.5 grams in weight which is half the weight of a Roman antoninianus of 3.5-4.5 grams. A Denarius in the early 3rd century was 2.5-3.00 grams of 52 percent or less of silver, but the Aksum coins were almost pure silver at first later debased. The name is unknown so it is referred to as an AR Unit.

=== Base coinage ===
Most bronze and silver coins have mainly been found in Aksum territory, with very few pieces found in Judea, Meroë and Egypt. They are based roughly on the size of older Roman As and Sestertius in shape and thickness. The design also developed like Roman coins in first being good but then the pictures turn archaic and non recognisable. The name is unknown so it is referred to as an Æ diameter in mm Unit, like Æ17 for a coin of 17 mm.

== Trade ==
At the time of Aksum's minting of currency, the state already had a long trade history with Greece, Rome, the Persian Empire, and India. That coinage began so late is in fact a little surprising. The late use of coinage may be attributed to the lack of a developed economy, required for coinage to be accepted. Most Aksumite coins were found in the large trade centres with very few in remote villages, where trade would be more through barter and not coinage based. In fact, the motivation for Aksum's initial minting of coins was for foreign trade and markets, as evidenced by the use of Greek on most of its coins. Moreover, gold coins seem to have been intended primarily for external trade, while copper and silver coins probably mainly circulated within the Aksumite empire, as the gold issues generally specified "king of the Aksumites" as title of the Aksumite king, whereas the title of silver and copper issues generally only read "king." International use of Aksumite coins seems to have begun early on, as coins of King Ezana and even of King Aphilas (the second Aksumite ruler to issue coins) have been found in India.

== Decline ==
During the 7th century, Aksumite power began to fail, and Ethiopian society began to withdraw further into the highland hinterlands, with the coastal areas becoming peripheral areas. The coins continued circulation, but were restricted to more local areas such as Nubia, South Arabia and the Horn of Africa.

== Archaeology ==
Due to the nature of the coins (e.g. providing kings' names), they have proved essential in constructing a chronology of the Kings of Aksum. An estimated 98 percent of the city of Aksum remains unexcavated, and other areas even more so. Through analysis of the number of coins produced and the style of coins, archaeologists have been able to construct a rough chronology, generally agreed upon until the late 6th- and 7th-century kings. Of the 20 Aksumite Kings attested by their coins, inscriptions corroborate the existence of only two, who happen to be the most famous kings: Ezana and Kaleb, both of whose reigns were periods of exceptional prosperity during the height of the Aksumite kingdom.

Many coins have been found in northern Ethiopia and Eritrea, the central region of Aksum, though Aksumite coins are reported to have been found in Arato and Lalibela. Many coins have been also found further afield. Numerous hoards of coins (always gold save one silver coin) have been found in Southern Arabia, much more than in Aksum itself, attesting perhaps to an Aksumite presence in parts of the region (perhaps supporting the use of titles claiming control over parts of South Arabia from GDRT's time). The hoards may be the remnants of hoards left in Kaleb's time (perhaps used to pay soldiers), when it was under an Aksumite governor. Outside of the Horn of Africa and Arabian Peninsula, coins have been found as far as Israel, Meroe, Egypt, and India. Silver and copper coins are mainly found in Aksum, though some can be traced to Palestinian pilgrim centers.

In addition to historical evidence, the coins' use of Ge'ez provides valuable linguistic information. Though rarely used, the vocalization of Ge'ez sometimes employed on Aksumite coins allows linguists to analyze vowel changes and shifts that cannot be represented in the older Semitic abjads such as Hebrew, Arabic, South Arabian, and earlier, unvocalized Ge'ez.

== See also ==
- History of Ethiopia
