= Endybis =

Late-3rd-century Aksumite king

- Aksumite king
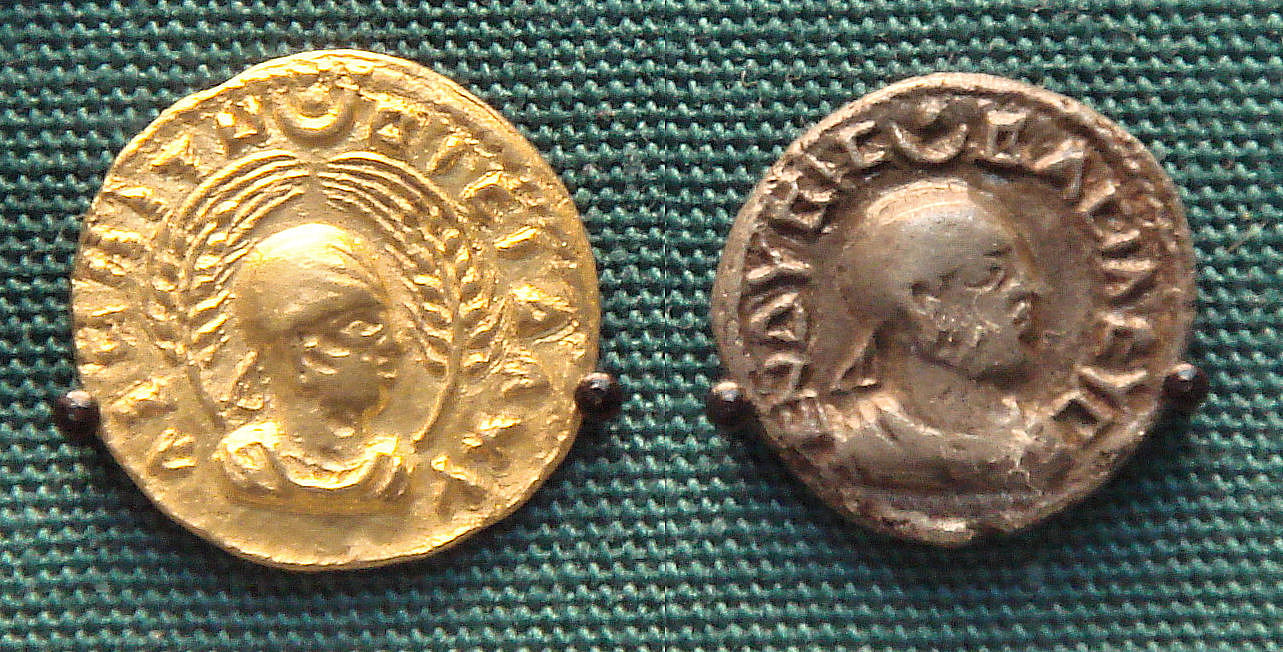
- Coins of king Endybis. The left one reads in Greek ΑΞΩΜΙΤΩ ΒΑϹΙΛΕΥϹ, 'King of Axum'. The right one reads ΕΝΔΥΒΙϹ ΒΑϹΙΛΕΥϹ, 'King Endybis'. British Museum.
- Reign: c. 270-300
- Predecessor: DTWNS
- Successor: Aphilas

Endybis or Endubis (Greek: Ενδυβις) was a late-3rd-century sovereign of the Kingdom of Aksum in East Africa (modern-day Ethiopia and Eritrea). He was among the earliest rulers in the Africa to mint his own coins; according to Stuart Munro-Hay, "No other sub-Saharan African state issued its own independent coinage in ancient times -- indeed no other African state at all, since those in North Africa (Libya and Mauritania) fell under Roman dominion." The Aksumite currency of his reign was issued in gold, silver, and bronze or copper denominations and bore inscriptions in Koine Greek.

== Coinage ==
The coins of Endybis are dated to c. 295 to c. 310 and are "undoubtedly [...] the oldest Aksumite coins". The weight of the gold coins issued in his reign are equivalent to "the weight of the half-aureus or quinarius of the last half of the 3rd century AD." More precise clues can be seen in the currency reforms during the reign of Diocletian, who reorganised the issuing of gold coins in 286 and silver coins in 294, the latter after having been suspended for several decades. As such, it is likely that the coins of Endybis, which were minted in gold, silver and copper, do not date to before c. 295.

The coins of Endybis set the design that his successors followed for the most part. Both obverse and reverse are characterized by a profile bust of the rule facing to the right, with a stalk of two-row barley on either side between the bust and the inscription. Endybis and his pagan successors include in the legend at the top of the coin a "crescent representing perhaps the Moon-god Sin and the disc representing Shams, the Sun-goddess."

Two mottos in Greek characterize the coins of Endybis:

- ΕΝΔΥΒΙϹ ΒΑϹΙΛΕΥϹ – 'King Endybis'
- ΑΞΩΜΙΤΩ ΒΙϹΙΔΑΧΥ – 'of the Aksumites, man of Daku', or 'bisi Dakhu'. This is the first appearance of the title "bisi", which Stuart Munro-Hay believed is related to the Ge'ez word ብእስየ bə'əsyä ('man of').

On some coins Endybis described himself as ΑΞΩΜΙΤΩ ΒΑϹΙΛΕΥϹ, 'king of Axum'.

== Gallery ==
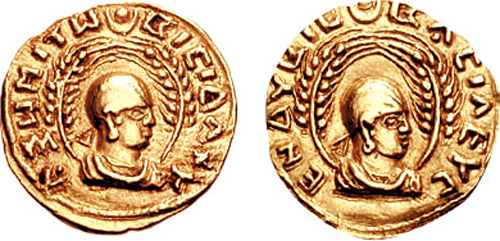
Gold coin of Endybis.

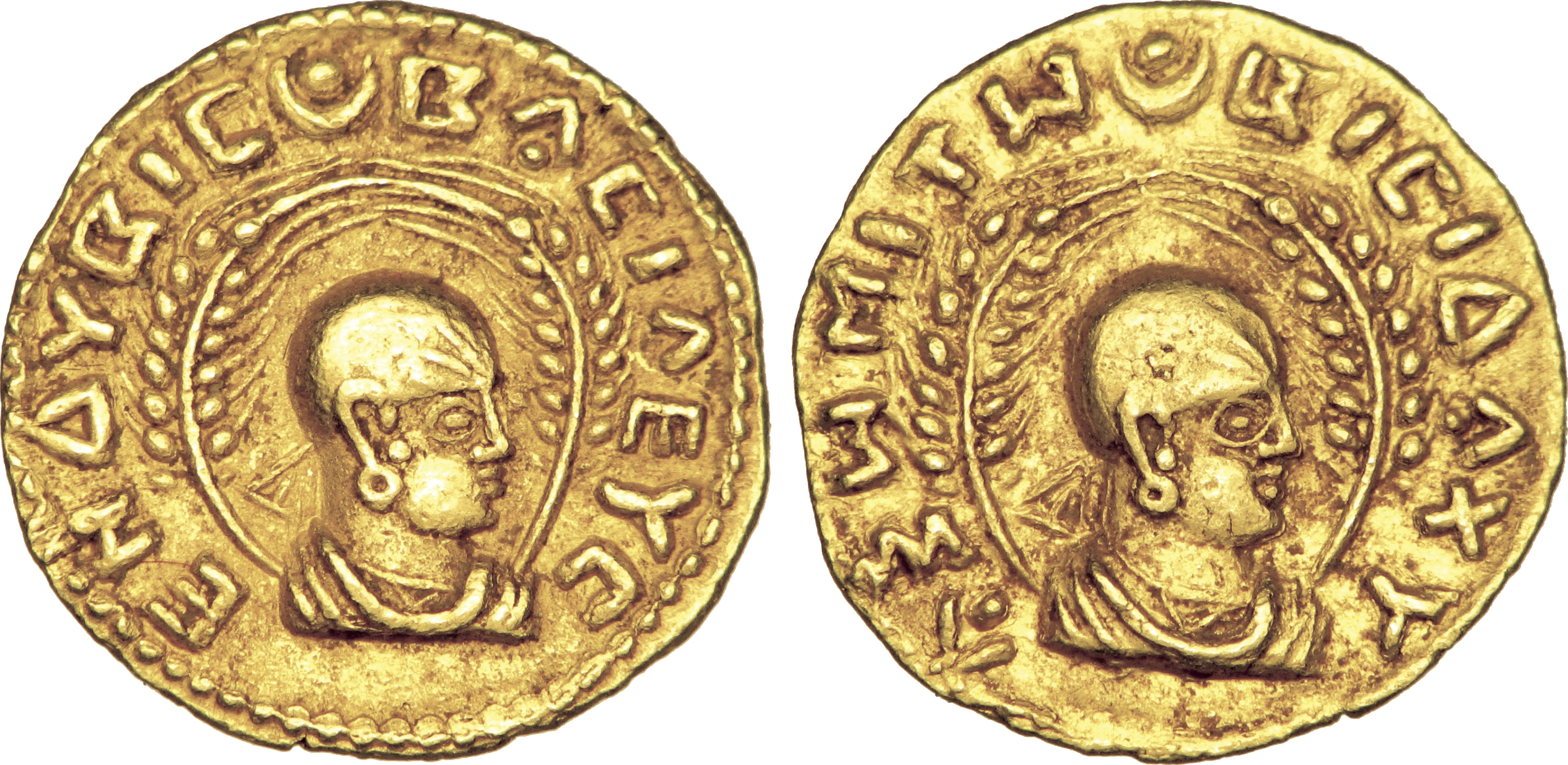
Gold coin of Endybis.

Regnal titles
Preceded by DTWNS	King of Axum	Succeeded by Aphilas
