= Nezool =

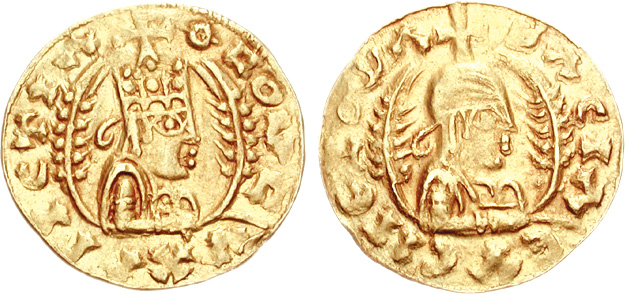

King of Aksum
- Reign: Late 5th Century-c.500 AD
- Predecessor: Ebana
- Successor: Ousas

Nezool (fl. later 5th century) was a king of the Kingdom of Aksum. He is primarily known from the coins minted during his reign, where his name also appears as Nezana.

Stuart Munro-Hay reports a theory that Nezool and Nezana were actually the names of a pair of kings who shared in a dual reign. However, the consensus is that Nezool is the Ge'ez version of his name transliterated into Greek, while Nezana is a more Greek-looking form.

== Coinage ==
A number of gold and silver coins bearing either the name Nezool or Nezana have been recovered and can be found in modern collections. Three types of gold coins bearing the name Nezana and one bearing the name Nezool have been identified. All three bear his right-facing profile on both the obverse and reverse, with an arm emerging from his robe holding a stick or a fly-whisk, and framed by stalks of wheat.

The only difference is in the inscriptions in Greek on the coins: one reads "King Nezana" on both sides; two have his title on one side, the other a legend acknowledging his kingship is due to God ("Thanks be to God"), and the fourth bears a variation on the enigmatic inscription found on other Aksumite coins, "+CΛX+ΛCΛ+CΛC+CΛN". The one issue in silver bears the profile of Nezana wearing a headcloth on the obverse, with a monogram that has been interpreted as derived from the Ge'ez characters for Nezool, while the reverse bears a double-lined cross, with the central boss tilted; the four arms of the cross divides the legend into four groups of two letters each: "ΘΕ ΟΥ ΧΛ ΡΙ" which is interpreted as abbreviated Greek for "By the Grace of God".

A number of anonymous copper coins are believed to have been minted during his reign.
