= Hataz =

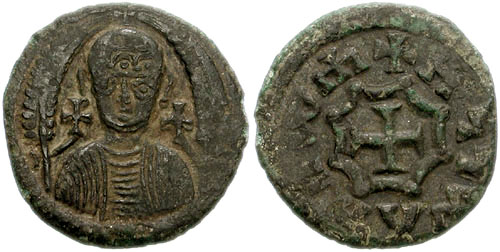

King of Aksum
- Reign: 585-590
- Predecessor: Ioel
- Successor: Israel

Hataz (late 6th or early 7th century AD) was a king of the Kingdom of Aksum. He is primarily known through the coins that were minted during his reign, some of which call him Iathlia. His gold coin calls him Hethasas (Greek ΗΘΑΣΑ).

The exact date of his reign is unclear. The debased nature of his gold and silver coinage clearly place his reign after Kaleb's. However, Stuart Munro-Hay places him between Ioel and Israel, while Wolfgang Hahn argues Hataz was the last king of Axum to mint coins.

== Coinage ==
Several types of coins were issued during Hataz's reign in gold, silver and copper. The obverse of the single gold coinage bears a crowned bust between two wheat stalks and encircled by dots; the reverse shows his profile wearing a headcloth also between two wheat stalks and encircled by dots. A cross at the top of both sides confirms his Christianity. The silver coinage, which is also "very debased" has three types: one with a crowned bust holding a hand cross on the obverse and a cross formed from four crosses dividing the legend and touching a lozenge with a cross in its middle; the other two bear the king's profile holding a hand-cross on the obverse and reverse. Three types of the copper coinage have also been identified, two also with the bust of the king on the obverse but a design incorporating one or more crosses on the reverse; the third type has profiles of the king on both sides.
