= 543 (disambiguation) =

543 was a year.

543 may also refer to:

- 543 (number)
- 543 BC
- List of United States Supreme Court cases, volume 543
- List of highways numbered 543
- List of state leaders in 543
- 543 Charlotte
- Unit 543
- Area code 543
- The 5-4-3 rule for configuring Ethernet networks
