= List of kings of Axum =

The kings of Axum ruled an important trading state in the area which is now northern Ethiopia and Eritrea, from 400 BC to 960 AD.

== Sources ==
Various regnal lists of Axumite monarchs have survived to the present day via manuscripts or oral tradition. However, the lists often contradict each other and many lists contain incomplete or scattered information. The lists were likely compiled over a long period at several different monasteries. Some historians consider these lists to be untrustworthy. There are a number of legendary figures at the beginning of some lists whose historicity is difficult to confirm or trace. Axumite kings may have used multiple names similar to the later Emperors of the Ethiopian Empire (1270–1974), resulting in different names for the same ruler on different lists.

Aksumite coins have proven useful for constructing a chronology of Axumite kings. Around 98 percent of the city of Axum has not yet been excavated. At least 18 kings have been identified with coinage covering the period from the late third century to the early seventh century.

== List ==
The following table contains names from both traditional regnal lists and names that are archeologically verified. German August Dillmann grouped the regnal lists into three types and the order of names will be based on his lists. The spelling of certain names are taken from lists recorded by E. A. Wallis Budge. The overall order of monarchs is partially based on the 1922 regnal list of Ethiopia, which is the only official Ethiopian regnal list that attempted to combine names from different lists into a longer chronological order.

=== Legendary period ===
Monarchs who reigned before Menelik I.

Portrait	Name	Dates	Notes
	Arwe "the serpent"	18th century BC (traditional)	Mythical serpent who reigned for 400 years. Also known as Wainaba.
	Angabo	14th century BC (traditional)	Killed the evil serpent king Arwe. Ruled for 200 years.
	[Za] Gedur I	12th century BC (traditional)	Ruled for 100 years. Also known as Zagdur.
	Sebado	11th century BC (traditional)	Ruled for 50 years.
	Kawnasya	10th century BC (traditional)	Ruled for 1 year.
	[Za] Makeda / Azeb	10th century BC (traditional)	Daughter of Kawnasya. Ruled for 50 years. In Ethiopian tradition, she is identified with the Biblical Queen of Sheba.

=== BCE era ===
Monarchs who reigned from Menelik I to Bazen.

Portrait	Name	Dates	Notes
	Menelik I	10th century BC (traditional)	Son of Makeda and Solomon in Ethiopian tradition. No. 1 on Dillmann's lists A and B. Reigned for 24, 25 or 29 years.
	[Za] Handadyu I		No. 2 on Dillmann's list A. Reigned for 1 or 8 years.
	Tomai		No. 2 on Dillmann's list B. Reigned for 15 years. Son of Menelik I. Sometimes known as Abd-Rakid.
	[Za] Aweda		No. 3 on Dillmann's list A. Reigned for 11 years. Also known as Aweda-Amat.
	[Za] Gedur II		No. 3 on Dillmann's list B.
	Aksumay		No. 4 on Dillmann's list B.
	[Za] Awseyo		No. 4 on Dillmann's list A and no. 5 on Dillmann's list B. Reigned for 3 years.
	[Za] Sawe / Tahawasya		No. 5 on Dillmann's list A and no. 6 on list B. Reigned for 31 or 34 years.
	Abralyus		No. 7 on Dillmann's list B.
	Warada Dahay		No. 8 on Dillmann's list B.
	Handadyu II		No. 9 on Dillmann's list B.
	Warada Nagash		No. 10 on Dillmann's list B.
	Awseya		No. 11 on Dillmann's list B.
	[Za] Gasyo		No. 6 on Dillmann's list A. Reigned for half a day.
	[Za] Mawat		No. 7 on Dillmann's list A. Reigned for either 8 years and 1 month, 8 years and 4 months, or 20 years and 1 month. Confusion of reign length may have resulted from similarity between the Ge'ez numbers for 8 (፰) and 20 (፳) and the numbers for 1 (፩) and 4 (፬).
	Elalyon		No. 12 on Dillmann's list B.
	Toma Seyon		No. 13 on Dillmann's list B.
	[Za] Bahas / Basyo		No. 8 on Dillmann's list A and no. 14 on list B. Reigned for 9 years. Possibly the same king as Gasyo in list A.
	Awtet I		No. 15 on Dillmann's list B.
	Zaware Nebrat		No. 16 on Dillmann's list B.
	Safay		No. 17 on Dillmann's list B.
	Ramhay	c. 330s–320s BC (traditional)	No. 18 on Dillmann's list B. According to an unpublished manuscript from Aksum, this king was a contemporary of Alexander the Great and asked for Greek technicians and engineers to build palaces, monuments and stelae, one of which was destroyed centuries later by Gudit.
	Hande		No. 19 on Dillmann's list B.
	[Za] Kawida		No. 9 on Dillmann's list A. Reigned for 2 years.
	[Za] Kanaz		No. 10 on Dillmann's list A. Reigned for 10 years.
	[Za] Hadena		No. 11 on Dillmann's list A. Reigned for 9 years. A female monarch according to the 1922 regnal list.
	[Za] Wazeha		No. 12 on Dillmann's list A. Reigned for 1 year.
	[Za] Hadir		No. 13 on Dillmann's list A. Reigned for 2 years.
	[Za] Kalas		No. 14 on Dillmann's list A. Reigned for 6 or 7 years. Confusion may have arisen from the similarity of the Ge'ez numbers for 6 (፮) and 7 (፯).
	[Za] Satyo		No. 15 on Dillmann's list A. Reigned for 16 or 17 years.
	[Za] Filya / Safelya		No. 16 on Dillmann's list A and no. 20 on list B. Reigned for 26 or 27 years. E. A. Wallis Budge theorised this king was Aphilas.
	[Za] Aglebu / Aglebul		No. 17 on Dillmann's list A and no. 21 on list B. Reigned for 3 years.
	[Za] Awsena		No. 18 on Dillmann's list A. Reigned for 1 year. A female monarch according to the 1922 regnal list.
	Bawawel		No. 22 on Dillmann's list B.
	[Za] Birwas / Bawaris		No. 19 on Dillmann's list A and no. 23 on list B. Reigned for 29 years.
	[Za] Mahasi		No. 20 on Dillmann's list A and no. 24 on list B. Reigned for 1 year.
	Nalke		No. 25 on Dillmann's list B.
	[Za Besi] Bazen	8 BC–8 or 9 AD (E.C.) (traditional)	No. 21 on Dillmann's list A and no. 26 on list B. Reigned for 16 or 17 years. Axumite regnal lists consistently date this king's reign to 8 years before the birth of Jesus. A tomb has been identified in local tradition as belong to Bazen.

=== CE Era (Pre-Christian) ===
Monarchs who reigned after Bazen and before the Christianisation of Ethiopia.

Monarchs who are attested via archaeology and/or external written sources outside the traditional regnal lists.

Portrait	Name	Dates	Notes
	[Za] Sartu		No. 1 on Dillmann's list A. Reigned for 26 or 27 years.
	Senfa Asgad		No. 1 on Dillmann's list C.
	Senfa Arad		No. 1 on Dillmann's list B.
	[Za] L'as		No. 2 on Dillmann's list A. Reigned for 10 years.
	Bahr Asagad		No. 2 on both Dillmann's list B and list C.
	[Za] Masenh		No. 3 on Dillmann's list A. Reigned for 7 years.
	Germa Sor		No. 3 on Dillmann's list B.
	[Za] Setwa		No. 4 on Dillmann's list A. Reigned for 9 years.
	Germa Asfare I		No. 4 on Dillmann's list B and no. 3 on list C.
	[Za] Adgala		No. 5 on Dillmann's list A. Reigned for 10 years and 6 or 7 months.
	[Za] Agba		No. 6 on Dillmann's list A. Reigned for 6 months.
	Serada		No. 4 on Dillmann's list C.
	[Za] Malis or Malik		No. 7 on Dillmann's list A. Reigned for 4, 6 or 7 years.
	Kulu Seyon		No. 5 on Dillmann's list C.
	[Za] Hakli		No. 8 on Dillmann's list A. Reigned for 13 years.
	Zoskales	1st century	The earliest known Axumite king from outside the traditional regnal lists. Recorded in Periplus of the Erythraean Sea. Could be the king Za Hakli or a local ruler in Adulis. The identification with Hakli has been disputed by some historians because the earliest of the regnal lists post date the Periplus by well over a thousand years
	Sarguai		No. 4 on Dillmann's list B and no. 6 on list C.
	[Za] Demahe		No. 9 on Dillmann's list A. Reigned for 10 years.
	Zaray		No. 5 on Dillmann's list B and no. 7 on list C.
	[Za] Awtet II		No. 10 on Dillmann's list A. Reigned for 2 years.
	Bagamai		No. 8 on Dillmann's list C.
	[Za] El–Aweda		No. 11 on Dillmann's list A. Reigned for 30 years.
	Djan Asagad		No. 9 on Dillmann's list C.
	Saba Asgad		No. 6 on Dillmann's list B.
	Zegen and Rema (Joint rule)		No. 12 on Dillmann's list A. Reigned for 4 or 8 years.
	Seyon Hegez		No. 10 on Dillmann's list C.
	Seyon Geza		No. 7 on Dillmann's list B.
	Moal Genha		No. 11 on Dillmann's list C.
	[Za] Gafale		No. 13 on Dillmann's list A. Reigned for 1 year.
	[Za] Besi Sark		No. 14 on Dillmann's list A. Reigned for 4 years.
	Agdur		No. 8 on Dillmann's list B and no. 13 on list C.
	[Za] Ela–Asguagua		No. 15 on Dillmann's list A. Reigned for 76 or 77 years.
	GDRT (vocalized by historians as Gadarat)	Early 3rd century	Inscriptions of GDR are the oldest surviving royal inscriptions in the Ge'ez alphabet. Inscriptions mention his son BYGT (vocalized as "Beygat" or "Beyga"). Possibly the king who wrote the Monumentum Adulitanum. His name could have inspired the names Gedur and Zagdur that appear on traditional lists.
	[Za] Ela–Herka		No. 16 on Dillmann's list A. Reigned for 21 years.
	[Za] Besi Saweza		No. 17 on Dillmann's list A. Reigned for 1 year.
	[Za] Wakana		No. 18 on Dillmann's list A. Reigned for 1 or 2 days. A female monarch according to the 1922 regnal list.
	[Za] Hadus		No. 19 on Dillmann's list A. Reigned for 4 months.
	[Za] Ela–Sagal		No. 20 on Dillmann's list A. Reigned for 2 or 3 years.
	[Za] Ela–Asfeha I		No. 21 on Dillmann's list A. Reigned for 14 years.
	ʽDBH (vocalized by historians as `Azaba or `Adhebah)	First half of the 3rd century	Known through South Arabian inscriptions. Inscriptions mention his son GRMT (vocalized as "Girma").
	[Za] Ela–Segab		No. 22 on Dillmann's list A. Reigned for 23 years.
	[Za] Ela–Samara		No. 23 on Dillmann's list A. Reigned for 3 years.
	Sembrouthes	c. 250	Known from a single inscription in Ancient Greek that was found at Dekemhare, which is dated to his 24th regnal year. First known ruler of Ethiopia to use the title "King of Kings". May have erected the Monumentum Adulitanum. May be the same king as Ela–Samara, but regnal lists only record 3 years of rule for him.
	DTWNS (vocalized by historians as Datawnas)	Second half of the 3rd century	Mentioned with his son ZQRNS (vocalized as "Zaqarnas") in an inscription from al-Mis'al in Yemen.
	[Za] Ela–Aiba		No. 24 on Dillmann's list A. Reigned for 16 or 17 years.
	[Za] Ela–Eskendi		No. 25 on Dillmann's list A. Reigned for 37 years.
	[Za] Ela–Saham I		No. 26 on Dillmann's list A. Reigned for 9 years.
	[Za] Ela–San		No. 27 on Dillmann's list A. Reigned for 13 years.
	[Za] Ela–Ayga		No. 28 on Dillmann's list A. Reigned for 18 years.
	Endybis	c. 295–310	The oldest known Axumite coins date to this king's reign.
	Aphilas	c. 310–early 320s	Only known from coins minted during his reign.
	Ousanas I [Za] Ela–Ameda I Saifa Ared	early 320s–mid 340s	Stuart Munro-Hay believed it is "very likely" that Ousanas is the king to whom Aedesius and Frumentius were brought. This king is known as Ella Amida in Ethiopian tradition. No. 29 on Dillmann's list A. Reigned for 30 years and 8 months according to traditional lists. Known as Tazer in some sources and lists. Saifa Ared is the throne name of Tazer, and this name is no. 9 on Dillmann's list B and no. 12 on list C. Tazer/Seifa Ared is the father of Abreha and Atsbeha in Ethiopian tradition.
	Wazeba	late 330s	Only known from coins minted during his reign, which were the first to be engraved in Ge'ez. Possibly a usurper during the reign of Ousanas.
	[Za] Ela–Ahyawa; Sofya (Regent)	mid 340s	Regent during the minority of her son Ezana. According to an unpublished history of kings from Axum, this ruler was the wife of Ella Amida (Ousanas) and reigned for three years during the minority of her sons Abreha and Atsbeha. The Gedle Abreha and Asbeha from the Church of Abreha wa-Atsbeha names her Sofya, and states she was the wife of king Tazer (Ousanas) and mother of Abreha and Atsbeha. No. 30 on Dillmann's list A. Reigned for 3 years. Known as Egwala Anbasa in some sources.

=== Christian Monarchs (4th–10th centuries) ===
Monarchs who were Christian, beginning with the reign of Ezana of Axum (historical) and/or Abreha and Atsbeha (traditional).

Monarchs who are attested via archaeology and/or external written sources outside the traditional regnal lists.

Portrait	Name	Dates	Notes
	Ezana / Ezanas	mid 340s–380	First Christian king of Axum. Converted by Frumentius. The exact date for the conversion is unknown and the circumstances around it have been obscured by hagiographical writings which have been "embellished by novelistic elements". The latest possible year for Ezana's conversion would be 360, which was calculated by Ethiopians as the beginning of an era in their medieval calendar (Amata Mehrat). His name does not appear on traditional regnal lists.
	[Za] Ela–Abreha and Atsbeha (Joint rule)	Early 4th century	In Ethiopian tradition, these brothers were the first to convert to Christianity. Likely based on Ezana and his brother Saizana. No. 31 on Dillmann's list A, no. 10 on list B and no. 14 on list C. Reigned for 27 years and 6 months.
	[Ela] Abreha I (Sole rule)		No. 1 on Dillmann's list A. Reigned for 12 years.
	[Ela] Atsbeha I (Sole rule)		No. 1 on Dillmann's list B.
	[Ela] Asfeha II		No. 2 on Dillmann's list A and no. 1 on list C. Reigned for 6 or 7 years.
	[Ela] Sahel I		No. 3 on Dillmann's list A. Reigned for 14 years.
	Ouazebas	late 4th century	Only known from coins minted during his reign.
	[Ela] Adhana I		No. 4 on Dillmann's list A. Reigned for 14 years. A female monarch according to the 1922 regnal list.
	[Ela] Rete		No. 5 on Dillmann's list A. Reigned for 1 year.
	[Ela] Asfeha III		No. 6 on Dillmann's list A. Reigned for 1 year.
	[Ela] Atsbeha II		No. 7 on Dillmann's list A. Reigned for 5 years.
	Eon/Noe	first third of 5th century	Primarily known from coins minted during his reign. Name written as Eon Bisi Anaaph on his coins. His coins were the first to use the title of "King of the land of the Abyssinians" instead of "King of the Axumites". Possibly the "Huina" from the Book of the Himyarites.
	MHDYS (vocalized as Mehadeyis)	c. 430	Primarily known from coins minted during his reign. May have been mentioned in Dionysiaca by Nonnus.
	[Ela] Ameda II		No. 8 on Dillmann's list A. Reigned for 16 years.
	[Ela] Abreha II		No. 9 on Dillmann's list A. Reigned for 6 months.
	[Ela] Sahel II		No. 10 on Dillmann's list A. Reigned for 2 months.
	[Ela] Gabaz I		No. 11 on Dillmann's list A. Reigned for 2 years.
	[Ela] Sahel III		No. 12 on Dillmann's list A. Reigned for 1 year.
	[Ela] Atzbah		No. 13 on Dillmann's list A. Reigned for 3 years.
	Ebana	middle third of 5th century	Only known from coins minted during his reign.
	[Ela] Abreha III and [Ela] Adhana II (Joint rule)		No. 14 on Dillmann's list A. Reigned for 16 years. Adhana II was a female monarch according to the 1922 regnal list.
	[Ela] Saham II		No. 15 on Dillmann's list A. Reigned for 28 years.
	Nezool / Nezana	later 5th century	Only known from coins minted during his reign. The name Nezool is the king's native name transcribed into Greek. The title "King of the land of the Abyssinians" was replaced by the formula "God's beneficence" beginning with coins of this king.
	[Ela] Ameda III		No. 16 on Dillmann's list A. Reigned for 12 years.
	[Ela] Sahel IV		No. 17 on Dillmann's list A. Reigned for 2 years.
	[Ela] Sebah		No. 18 on Dillmann's list A. Reigned for 2 years.
	[Ela] Saham III		No. 19 on Dillmann's list A. Reigned for 15 years.
	[Ela] Gabaz II		No. 20 on Dillmann's list A. Reigned for 21 years.
	Agabe and Lewi (Joint rule)		No. 21 on Dillmann's list A. Reigned for 4 years.
	Arfed		No. 2 on both Dillmann's lists B and C. Brother of and co-ruler with Amsi according to list C.
	Amsi		No. 3 on both Dillmann's lists B and C. Brother of and co-ruler with Arfed according to list C.
	Arad		No. 4 on Dillmann's list C.
	Saladoba		No. 4 on Dillmann's list B and no. 5 on list C.
	[Ela] Ameda IV; Alamida	late 530s–550s	The Nine Saints came to Ethiopia during his reign. No. 22 on Dillmann's list A, no. 5 on list B and no. 6 on list C. Reigned for 11 years.
	Yaqob I and Dawit (Joint rule)		No. 23 on Dillmann's list A. Reigned jointly for 3 years.
	Armah I		No. 24 on Dillmann's list A and no. 13 on list C. Reigned for 14 years and 7 months.
	Ousas / Ousanas II; Zitana / Tazena	early 6th century	No. 25 on Dillmann's list A, no. 6 on list B and no. 7 on list C. Reigned for 2 years. The name Ousanas was abbreviated to Ousana or Ousas on some coins.
	Yaqob II		No. 26 on Dillmann's list A. Reigned for 9 years. Known for his shocking cruelties and wickedness and was defeated by Ella Atsbeha (Kaleb).
	Kaleb / K(h)aleb; Constantinos I Atsbeha III	510s–late 530s	No. 27 on Dillmann's list A, no. 7 on list B and no. 8 on list C. Reigned for 28 years. Some of his coins record the filiation "son of Thezana", which is unique among Axumite kings. This suggests he wanted to legitimise his descent from a former king. Wolfgang Kahn and Vincent West suggested this king was Nezana.
	Beta Israel	c. 550 or 570s	Son of Kaleb. No. 28 on Dillmann's list A. Reigned for 8 months according to the traditional lists.
	Gabra Masqal	534–548	Son of Kaleb. The composer Yared lived during this king's reign. No. 29 on Dillmann's list A, no. 8 on list B and no. 9 on list C. Reigned for 14 years.
	Constantinos II		Son of Gabra Masqal. No. 9 on Dillmann's list B and no. 10 on list C.
	Wazena	550s and 560s	Only known from coins minted during his reign.
	WʽZB (vocalized as Waʽzeb)	6th century	Only known from coins minted during his reign.
	Wasan Sagad		No. 10 on Dillmann's list B. Son of Gabra Masqal according to one list. Theorised by E. A. Wallis Budge to be the same person as Bazgar.
	Bazgar		No. 11 on Dillmann's list C.
	Asfeha IV		No. 12 on Dillmann's list C.
	Djan Asfeh		No. 14 on Dillmann's list C.
	Djan Asgad		No. 15 on Dillmann's list C.
	Saifu	c. 577	A possible Axumite king mentioned in a Chinese biography of the prophet Muhammad, as the grandfather of the king who ruled during the Muslime Migration to Abyssinia. Stuart Munro-Hay thought it was plausible Saifu was a historical Axumite king. Wolfgang Hahn instead believes Saifu was Saif ibn Dhi Yazan and had no connection at all with the Axumite monarchy.
	Fere Sanai		No. 11 on Dillmann's list B and no. 16 on list C.
	Gersem	c. 580	Only known from coins minted during his reign. E. A. Wallis Budge theorised this king used the Biblical name Gershom.
	Ioel / Joel	590s–after 600 or c. 600	Only known from coins minted during his reign.
	Hataz / Hethasas	c. 590 or c. 620	Only known from coins minted during his reign. Known as Iathlia on some coins.
	Armah	late 6th century/early 7th century	Primarily known from coins minted during his reign. Two kings named Armah appear on traditional regnal lists, but their chronological placement is at odds with numistic evidence.
	Aderaz	620–623 (Traditional dates)	No. 12 on Dillmann's list B and no. 17 on list C. Ethiopian sources identify this king as the Najashi of Islamic tradition.
	Najashi	614–630	Reigned at the time of the Muslim Migration to Abyssinia in 613 or 615. Name likely based on the title Negus.
	Zeray I (Surname); Akala Udem / Eklewudem (Throne Name)	623–633 (Traditional dates)	No. 13 on Dillmann's list B and no. 23 on list C.
	Germa Asfare II; Germay (Surname); Asfar (Throne Name)	633–648 (Traditional dates)	No. 14 on Dillmann's list B and no. 24 on list C.
	Zeray II (Surname); Zirgaz I / Germa Sor (Throne Name)	648–656 (Traditional dates)	No. 15 on Dillmann's list B and no. 25 on list C.
	Zirgaz II (Surname); Degna Mikael (Throne Name)	656–677 (Traditional dates)	No. 16 on Dillmann's list B and no. 26 on list C. A contemporary of Heraclius (r. 610–641) according to a manuscript from Debre Markos.
	Ekle (Surname); Bahr Ikla / Bahre Ekil (Throne Name)	677–696 (Traditional dates)	No. 17 on Dillmann's list B.
	Hizba Sion (Surname); Gum (Throne Name)	696–720 (Traditional dates)	No. 18 on Dillmann's list B.
	Asguamgum (Throne Name)	720–725 (Traditional dates)	No. 19 on Dillmann's list B.
	Letem (Throne Name)	725–741 (Traditional dates)	No. 20 on Dillmann's list B.
	Talatem (Throne Name)	741–762 (Traditional dates)	No. 21 on Dillmann's list B.
	Oda Gosh / Badagaz / Adegosh (Surname); Lul Sagad (Throne Name)	762–775 (Traditional dates)	No. 22 on Dillmann's list B and no. 27 on list C.
	Ayzur (Throne Name)	775 (Traditional dates)	No. 23 on Dillmann's list B and no. 18 on list C. Reigned for half a day.
	Dedem (Surname); Almaz Sagad (Throne Name)	775–780 (Traditional dates)	No. 24 on Dillmann's list B.
	Udedem / Wudemdem (Throne Name)	780–790 (Traditional dates)	No. 25 on Dillmann's list B.
	Dimawudem (Surname); Wedem Asfare (Throne Name)	790–820 (Traditional dates) c. 792–822	No. 26 on Dillmann's list B. Lived for 150 years according to the traditional lists.
	Remha (Surname); Armah II (Throne Name)	820–825 (Traditional dates)	No. 27 on Dillmann's list B and no. 28 on list C. Last ruler before the Zagwe dynasty according to list C.
	Degna Djan (Throne Name)	825–845 (Traditional dates)	No. 28 on Dillmann's list B. Reigned for 19 years and 10 months.
	Dagajan / Geda Djan (Throne Name)	845 (Traditional dates)	No. 29 on Dillmann's list B. Reigned for 10 months.
	Gudit (Throne Name); Esato	845–885 (Traditional dates)	A queen who, according to tradition, sacked Aksum and was responsible for the end of the kingdom. Some lists place her after Dil Na'od, therefore marking the end of the Axumite line, while other lists place her before him and present her reign as an interruption to the line before it was restored after her death. No. 21 on Dillmann's list C. Ruled after Dil Na'od on list B and after Madai on list C.
	Dagnajan (Surname); Anabasa Udem (Throne Name)	885–905 (Traditional dates)	No. 30 on Dillmann's list B and no. 22 on list C.
	Dil Na'od (Throne Name)	905–915 (Traditional dates)	Most sources consider this king to be last to rule the Axumite kingdom. He was the younger of son of Degna Djan and brother of Anbasa Wedem. Had a short reign of around 10 years. One tradition recorded by James Bruce states he was an infant when Gudit killed the princes imprisoned at Debre Damo and had to be taken out of the kingdom by nobles to save his life. No. 31 on Dillmann's list B and no. 19 on list C. Last ruler before the Zagwe dynasty according to list B.
	Madai		No. 20 on Dillmann's list C.

== See also ==
- Kingdom of Aksum
- Lists of office-holders
- Regnal lists of Ethiopia
- List of emperors of Ethiopia (1270–1975)

== Bibliography ==
- Bruce, James (1790). Travels to discover the source of the Nile, in the years 1768, 1769, 1770, 1771, 1772, and 1773: Volume II. Edinburgh.
- Budge, E. A. (1928a). A History of Ethiopia: Nubia and Abyssinia (Volume I). London: Methuen & Co.
- Dillmann, August (1853). "Zur Geschichte des abyssinischen Reichs". Zeitschrift der Deutschen Morgenländischen Gesellschaft (in German). 7: 338–364.
- Hahn, Wolfgang; West, Vincent (2016). Sylloge of Aksumite Coins in the Ashmolean Museum, Oxford. Oxford: Ashmolean. ISBN 9781910807101.
- Henze, Paul B. (2000). Layers of Time: A History of Ethiopia. London: Hurst & Company. ISBN 1-85065-522-7.
- Kropp, Manfred (2006). "Ein später Schüler des Julius Africanus zu Beginn des 20. Jahrhunderts in Äthiopien". In Wallraf, Martin (ed.). Julius Africanus und die christliche Weltchronistik (in German). Berlin: Walter de Gruyter. ISBN 978-3-11-019105-9.
- Stewart, John (2006). African States and Rulers (third ed.). London: McFarland. p. 23. ISBN 0-7864-2562-8.
- Munro-Hay, Stuart (1978). The Chronology of Aksum: A Reappraisal of the History and Development of the Aksumite State from Numismatic and Archeological Evidence. University of London.
- Munro-Hay, Stuart (1991). Aksum: An African Civilization of Late Antiquity. Edinburgh: Edinburgh University Press.
- Páez, Pedro (2008). Isabel Boavida; Hervé Pennec; Manuel João Ramos (eds.). História da Etiópia (in Portuguese). Assirio & Alvim.
- Salt, Henry (1814). A Voyage to Abyssinia. London: W. Bulmer and Co.
- Sellassie, Sergew Hable (1972a). Ancient and Medieval Ethiopian History to 1270. Addis Ababa.
- Sellassie, Sergew Hable (1972b). "The Problem of Gudit". Journal of Ethiopian Studies. 10 (1): 113–124. ISSN 0304-2243. JSTOR 41965849.
- Tamrat, Taddesse (1972). Church and State in Ethiopia. Oxford: Clarendon Press.
- Truhart, Peter (1984). Regents of Nations (Part 1). Munich: K. G. Saur. ISBN 3-598-10492-8.
