= Wazeba of Axum =

Wazeba
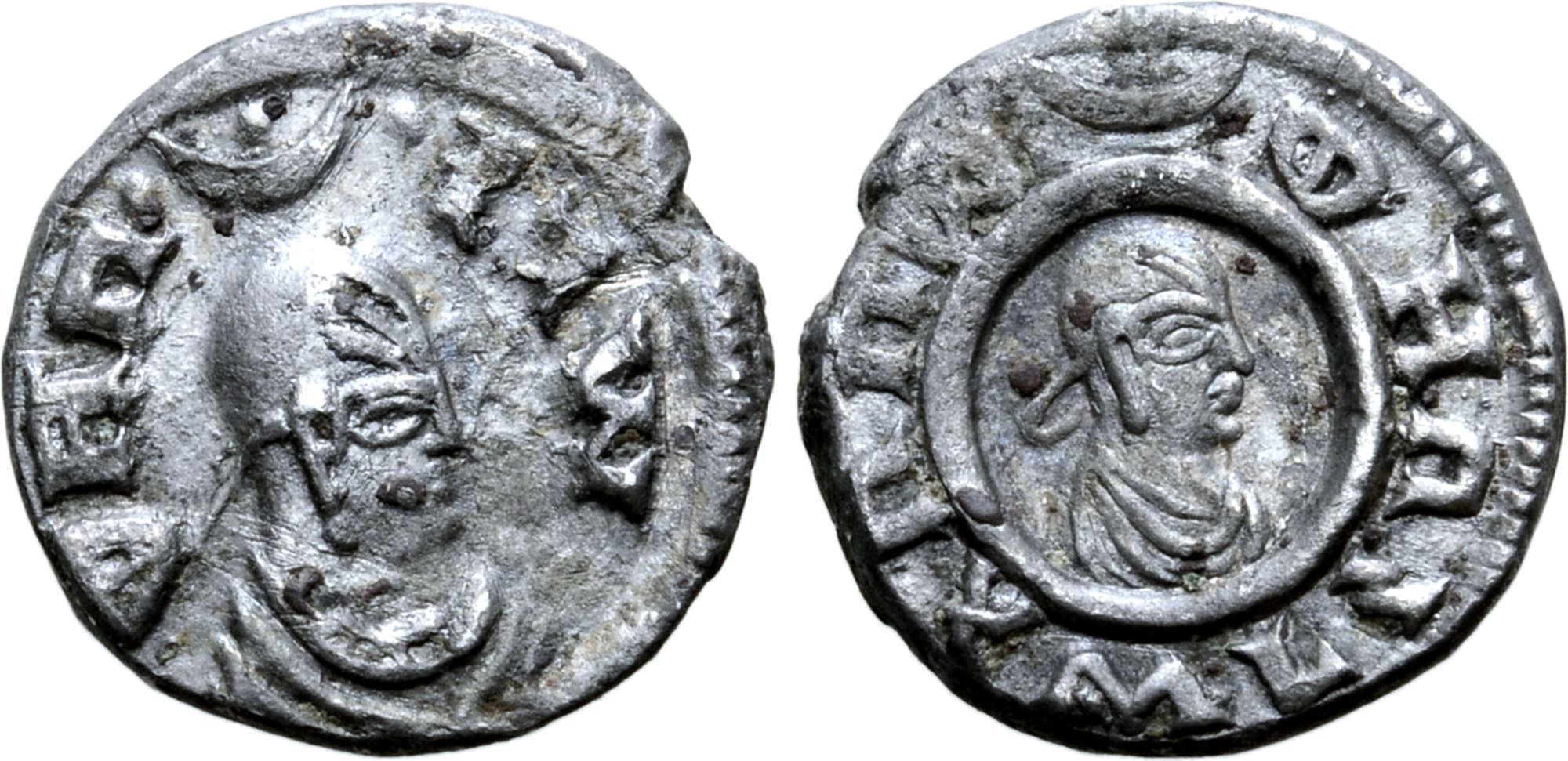

King of Aksum
- Reign: 310s
- Predecessor: Aphilas
- Successor: Ousanas

Wazeba (early 4th century), vocalized by historians as Wazeba, or WZB was a Negus of the Kingdom of Aksum, centered in the highlands of modern Ethiopia and Eritrea. He succeeded Aphilas. Wazeba is known only from the coins that he minted during his reign. He was the first Aksumite ruler to engrave the legends of his coins in Ge'ez, and the only King of Aksum to use that language on his gold currency. Stuart Munro-Hay suggests that the scarcity of Wazeba's coins may hint at a short reign.

The Geta Lion near Kombolcha is a stone statue with a very eroded short inscription surrounding a cross. French archaeologist Francis Anfray states Wazeba's coinage has a similar monogram. However it was Ezana who is known for converting to Christianity, not Wazeba. None of Wazeba's coins feature a Christian cross like this inscription.

== Coinage ==
Wazeba's coins were the first Aksumite coins to use the script and language (Ge'ez), with some variations on the regalia on gold coins. The standard design was restored by Ousanas.

There is one coin issue that combines a die from Wazeba on the obverse and a die from Ousanas on the reverse. Munro-Hay suggests that these two kings may have been co-rulers. Wolfgang Hahn and Vincent West instead suggested that Wazeba was an usurper who interrupted the reign of Ousanas.
