= Ouazebas =

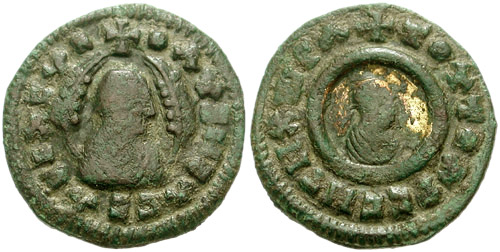

King of Aksum
- Reign: Mid 4th Century-Late 4th Century
- Predecessor: MHDYS
- Successor: Eon

Ouazebas (late 4th century) was a King of the Kingdom of Aksum. He is primarily known through the coins that were minted during his reign.

Ouazebas' coins were found beneath the remains of the largest stela in the city of Axum. This suggests that the stele had fallen as early as his reign. Stuart Munro-Hay suggests that this particular stela was the last one erected, and that "possibly they went out of favor as Christianity spread, bringing with it new ideas about burial.

== Coinage ==
Ouazebas reintroduced on the obverse of his bronze coins a motto from the time of Ezana: TOYTOAPECHTHXWPA, meaning "May this please the people". Munro-Hay comments that this motto is "a rather attractive peculiarity of Aksumite coinage, giving a feeling of royal concern and responsibility towards the people's wishes and contentment".

The reverse of the bronze coins have a new feature: a halo of gold around the king's head, as was done for the silver coins of Aphilas and Ousanas. Munro-Hay regretfully notes that "because of the conditions in which many of these coins have been buried, the prevalence of bronze disease means that it is quite rare to come across specimens in good condition".
