= Ebana =

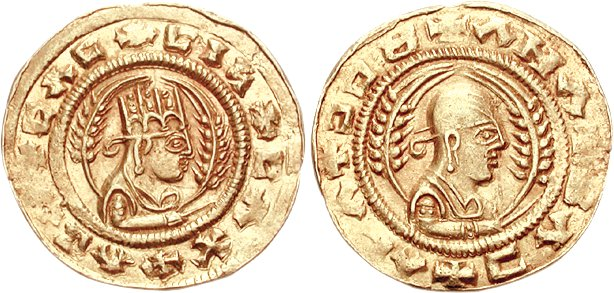

King of Aksum
- Reign: Mid 5th Century-Late 5th Century
- Predecessor: Eon
- Successor: Nezool

Ebana was a 5th-century King of the Kingdom of Axum. He is primarily known from the series of coins that were minted during his reign. His gold coins "are easily the commonest of Aksumite gold issues".

== Coinage ==
The gold coins of Ebana are by far the most common of all Aksumite gold coins; the al-Madhariba hoard, recovered from Yemen, alone contained 538 examples of his gold coins, allowing for die-link comparisons to be made. Stuart Munro-Hay speculates that the large number of coins suggests that "he reigned for a considerable time".

The enigmatic inscription + BAC + CIN + BAX + ABA, which first appeared on the coins of Eon, also appear on the obverse of Ebana's coins.
