= Israel of Axum =

King of Aksum from 590 to 600

Israel
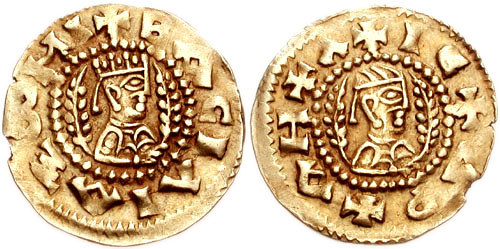
- Coin of the Axumite king Israel

King of Aksum
- Reign: 590-600
- Predecessor: Ioel
- Successor: Gersem

Israel (vocalized Ge'ez: እስራኤል ʾIsrāʾēl or ይስራኤል Yisrāʾēl, c. 590) was a king of Axum. He is primarily known through the coins minted during his reign. He is one of several Aksumite kings with a Biblical name, the others include Ioel, Kaleb, Gersem, and likely Noe; Richard Pankhurst mentions the name of this king as an early example of Judaic influence in Ethiopian culture.

The Kebra Nagast and Ethiopian historical tradition states that Kaleb had two sons, Israel and Gabra Masqal. One tradition claims that Israel was governor of Adwa during his father's reign, but otherwise the Ethiopian chronicles tell little else about him. The 1922 regnal list of Ethiopia states that Israel ruled only for one month between Kaleb and Gabra Masqal.

Skeptical that this Israel was actually the son of King Kaleb, Stuart Munro-Hay suggests that Israel may have been a better ruler than the other kings between him and Kaleb (or Gabra Masqal), and tradition compressed the succession.

== Coins ==
Two types of coins have been dated to Israel's reign, one in gold, the other in copper. Wolfgang Hahn notes that his coinage "would be very rare were it not for the 34 pieces which made up the Adulis hoard of 1907 and which are closely die-related". This gold issue bears a profile of the king on both the obverse and reverse, holding one of the stalks of barley on either side; an inscription in Greek runs along the edge of both sides, with a Greek cross at the top. The copper issue also bears a profile of the king holding a scepter cruciger on the obverse, but the reverse differs from the gold issue by having a cross with flared arms in the middle surrounded by a circle of dots; the inscriptions on the copper issue is in Ge'ez, the obverse is translated "King Israel" while the reverse is "Peace to the people" in English.
