= Gebre Meskel =

Gebre Meskel ገብረ መስቀል
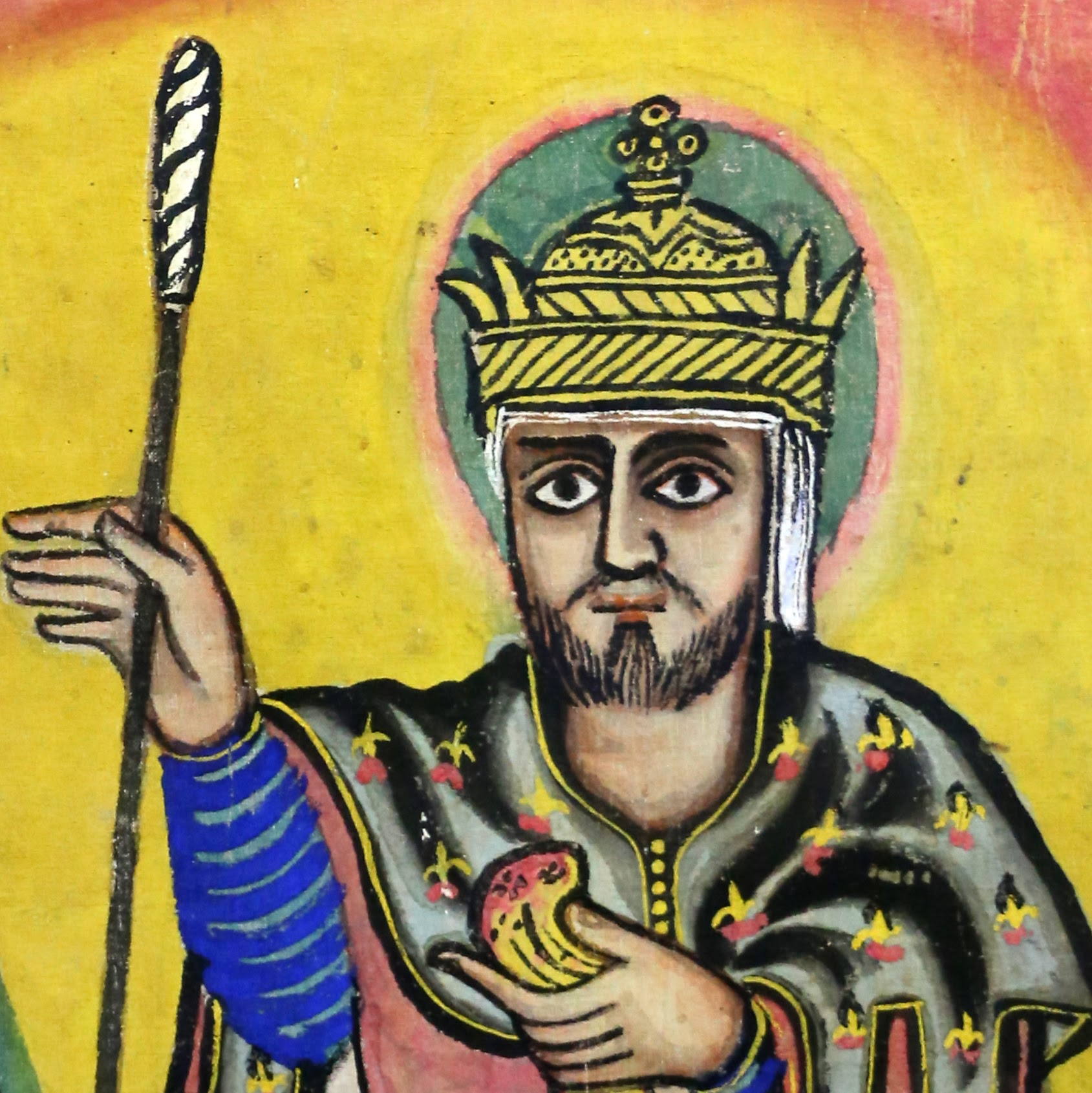
- Detail from a painting in Ura Kidane Mehret.

King of Axum
- Reign: 534–548 or 550–564
- Predecessor: Kaleb or Israel
- Successor: Kostantinos
- Born: Axum
- Issue: Kostantinos
- Father: Kaleb
- Religion: Coptic Christianity

Gebre Meskel (Ge'ez: ገብረ መስቀል gäbrä mäsqäl, "Servant of the Cross") also known as Gabra Masqal was a King of Axum who reigned in the 6th century. He was a son of Kaleb of Axum and brother to Israel of Axum. His reign is most notable for the compositions of hymns by the Ethiopian saint Yared.

== Background ==
According to one source, Gebre Meskel had a high administrative position in the Shewa region during the reign of his father. Oral tradition claims his seat was in the mountains of Menagesha.

Most Axumite regnal lists name Gebre Meskel as the direct successor of his father Kaleb. Lists that include reign lengths state he ruled for 14 years. A regnal list quoted by Carlo Conti Rossini stated this king reigned for 40 years. Some lists place Gebre Meskel after his brother Israel, who reigned for 8 months. The 1922 regnal list of Ethiopia, as quoted by then Prince Regent Tafari Makonnen, stated this king reigned for 14 years and succeeded king Za Israel, who apparently only reigned for one month according to this list. The 1922 regnal list gave his regnal dates as 523–537 E.C.

According to the Kebra Nagast Gebre Meskel was the youngest son of Kaleb and succeeded him to the throne after Kaleb retired to a monastery.

To date, no Axumite coinage has been discovered bearing the name of this king.

Most regnal lists name Kostantinos as Gebre Meskel's successor.

== Accession to the throne ==
Various sources suggest that a struggle for the throne emerged after the end of the reign of Kaleb, who had died or abdicated depending on the source. One source claims that Gebre Meskel was the rightful heir to the throne, as he was Kaleb's eldest son, but the throne was usurped by his brother Beta Israel, who would later drop dead when priests announced that they had asked the retired king Kaleb who he wanted as his successor and he had chosen Gebre Meskel. A different source claimed that it was Israel who was the rightful heir and that his brother was the one who had usurped the throne, leading to a long-lasting conflict.

Hagiographical sources consider Gebre Meskel to be Kaleb's only son and completely ignore Israel.

== Reign ==
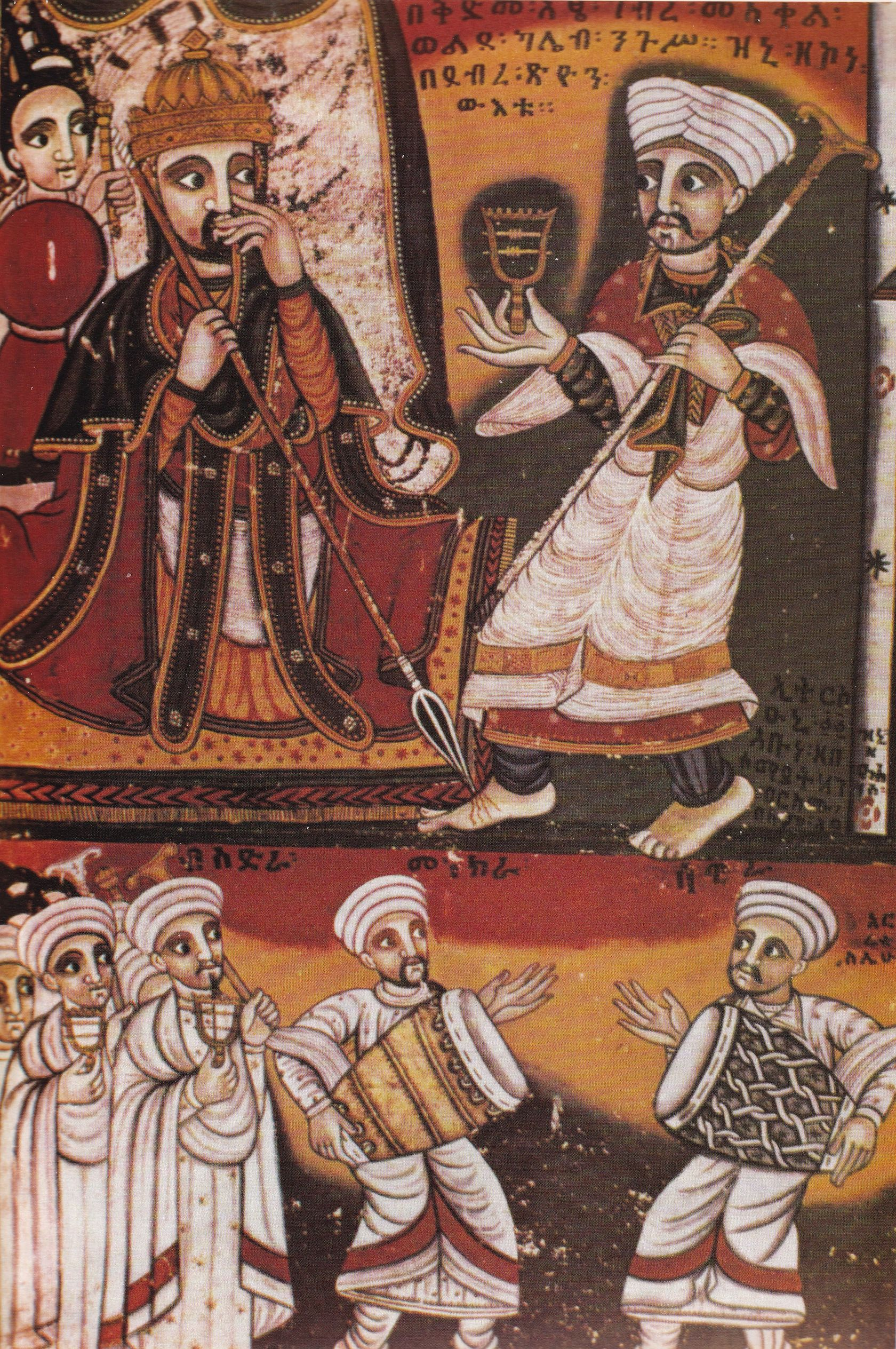
Yared sings to Gebre Meskel (c. 15th century painting)

Ethiopian sources generally indicate that Gebre Meskel's reign was peaceful. However, outside of Ethiopia events were less peaceful. The territory of south Arabia, conquered by his father Kaleb, was likely lost during the reign of Gebre Meskel and the Persians annexed the territory by c. 575.

Some chronicles claim that in the seventh year of his reign, he travelled to Jerusalem and afterwards built a palace in Samaria in Nablus.

The Axumite composer and saint Yared is said to have composed hymns in the reign of Gebre Meskel.

According to oral tradition, Gebre Meskel was killed when we went to eastern Tigray to wage war. He has been canonized by the Ethiopian Church and his feast is observed on 29 Hedar (8 December).

== Building projects ==
A text named Gedle Asfé credits the construction of St. Mary's Church in Yeha to Gebre Meskel. Another text named Gedle Aregawi stated the monastery of Debre Damo was built during his reign. Ethiopian tradition also states that the Zur Amba church in Begemder was founded during Gebre Meskel's reign.

Gebre Meskel is additionally credited with building a palace next to one built by his father Kaleb.

Some sources state that he was buried in the church of Debre Selam in the Oromia region. However, there is also a tomb in the Tigray Region known as the "Tomb of Gabra Masqal", which is dated to c. 599.

== Legacy ==
The name "Gebre Meskel" or "Gabra Maskal" has been used as a regnal name by at least three Ethiopian emperors:

- Lalibela (r. 1181–1221)
- Amda Seyon I (r. 1314–1344)
- Yeshaq (r. 1414–1429)

== Traditional regnal lists ==
Both August Dillmann and Carlo Conti Rossini studied surviving Abyssinian regnal lists and grouped them into three (lists A–C) and eight (lists A–H) types respectively. Gebre Meskel appears on the following lists:

Gebre Meskel on traditional Ethiopian and Eritrean regnal lists
List	Predecessor	Successor	Statements and Notes	Ref.
Dillmann List A / Rossini List C	Beta Esrael	–	Reigned for 14 years. Last name on this list.	
Dillmann List B / Rossini List B	Kaleb	Constantinos		
Dillmann List C / Rossini List A	Kaleb	Constantinos		
Rossini List D	Kaleb	Constantinos		
Rossini List E	Kaleb	Yeshaq	Reigned for 40 years.	
Rossini List F	Kaleb	Ma'eda Kala	Reigned for 37 years.	
Rossini List G	Kaleb	Constantinos		

== See also ==
- Kaleb of Axum
- Israel of Axum
- Yared

== Bibliography ==
- Budge, E. A. (1928a). A History of Ethiopia: Nubia and Abyssinia (Volume I). London: Methuen & Co.
- Dillmann, August (1853). "Zur Geschichte des abyssinischen Reichs". Zeitschrift der Deutschen Morgenländischen Gesellschaft (in German). 7 (3): 338–364.
- Edwards, Frederick A. (1918). "The Early Kings of Axum". The Asiatic Review. 14: 438–503.
- Páez, Pedro (2008). Isabel Boavida; Hervé Pennec; Manuel João Ramos (eds.). História da Etiópia (in Portuguese). Assirio & Alvim.
- Rey, C. F. (1927). In the Country of the Blue Nile. London: Camelot Press.
- Rüppell, Eduard (1840). Reise in Abyssinien: Zweiter Band. Frankfurt.
- Salt, Henry (1814). A Voyage to Abyssinia. London: W. Bulmer and Co.
- Sellassie, Sergew Hable (1972). Ancient and Medieval Ethiopian History to 1270. Addis Ababa.

Regnal titles
Preceded by Kaleb or Israel	King of Axum	Succeeded by Kostantinos
