= WʽZB =

King of Aksum from 570 to 580

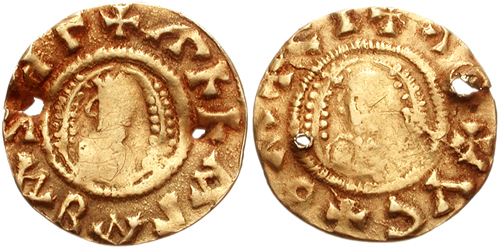

King of Aksum
- Reign: 570-580
- Predecessor: Wazena
- Successor: Ioel

WʽZB (vocalized as Waʽzeb) or Ella Gabaz was a king of Axum (flourished mid 6th century). He uses the name "Ella Gabaz" on his coinage, but calls himself WʽZB in an inscription where he states he is the "son of Ella Atsbeha", or king Kaleb.

In his discussion of this king, Stuart Munro-Hay draws on material from the story of Abba Libanos, the "Apostle of Eritrea", in which a king named "Za-Gabaza Aksum" is mentioned, to suggest that Ella Gabaz and Za-Gabaza might be epithets WʽZB adopted, and indicate that he did some important construction on Mariam Syon (or Church of Our Lady Mary of Zion) in Axum.
