= MHDYS =

Mehadeyis
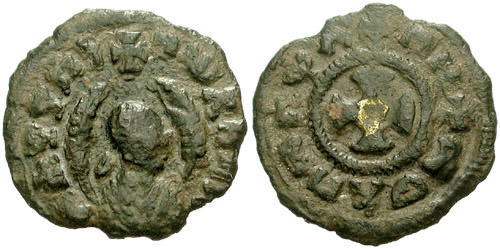
- Bronze "unit" of MHDYS

King of Aksum
- Predecessor: Ezana
- Successor: Ouazebas
- Religion: Christianity

MHDYS (Ge'ez: መሐደየሰ, Mḥdys; vocalized by historians as Mehadeyis, Maḥdəy-os, and Matthias) was a ruler of the Kingdom of Aksum (flourished 4th century AD). He is primarily known through the coins that were minted during his reign, although a contemporary poet, Nonnus of Panopolis, may have alluded to him in his epic Dionysiaca.

His name is usually vocalized by historians as Mehadeyis, although it has recently been argued by Manfred Kropp that it could vocalized as Maḥdəy-os, producing a Greek equivalent of Μωδαῖος. He is also known as Matthias.

== Coinage ==
MHDYS was one of two rulers who used Ge'ez as the language of the legend on his gold coins.

Four types of coins were minted during his reign, in gold, silver, and copper; the latter was often gilded. One of the gold types and both of the other metals have the same pattern: the obverse shows the king in profile with a crown, the reverse a cross with a stalk of barley on either side. These bear the same inscriptions. The obverse shows the inscription nags mw' MHDYS ("The victorious king MHDYS"); the reverse bzmsql tmw ("By this cross victorious"). The latter inscription is understood to be a loose translation of the famous motto of Emperor Constantine the Great, In hoc signo vinces ("By this sign you will conquer").

Until recently, MHDYS's reign was dated to the mid-4th century. However, Munro-Hay published a gold coin issued by this ruler that was found in Yemen "in every way a new type." While it bore an inscription similar to previously known coins, its reverse portrayed winged Victory in a flowing robe, holding a cross on a long staff. Munro-Hay notes that the robe is "extremely similar" to that on coins issued by the Roman emperor Theodosius II at Constantinople between 420 and 423; this solidus design was revived by Emperors ruling later in the 5th century, namely Marcian, Leo I, Zeno, and Anastasius I Dicorus. This similarity of design, Munro-Hay argues, permits the date of MHDYS to "be attempted with rather more likelihood of accuracy; sometime after 420, and perhaps reigning in the 450s." However, Amelia Dowler believes this is an imitation of an Aksumite coin produced in India in the 6th century.

Further, the authenticity of the known silver coins of MHDYS has been questioned. A chemical-physical analysis described in an article published in 2003 claimed to have found the composition of some silver coins did not conform to the silver composition of other known genuine coins. Wolfgang Hahn has concluded these were the work of "a jeweler's firm which was very active in Asmara in the 1950s/60s".

== Mentioned by Nonnus ==
Nonnus' epic poem about the god Dionysus, the Dionysiaca, twice mentions one "Modaios". The first mention is at 32.165:

(Ares) took the form of the champion Modaios, more than all others unsated with battle, whose joy was joyless carnage, whom bloodshed pleased better than banquets.

Another is at 40.235f:

(Dionysus) assigned a governor for Indians, choosing the god-fearing Modaios.

The expert consensus has been that this Modaios refers to a character in an earlier poem Bassaria by one Dionysus which is only known from fragments of papyrus. However, Manfred Kropp proposed this was an allusion to the king of Aksum, MHDYS. This identification would provide a deeper meaning to his borrowing of Constantine's famous phrase, In hoc signo vinces: MHDYS had a reputation for prowess in battle, possibly against his pagan neighbors.

Further, if Kropp's identification is correct this would also set an upper limit to MHDYS' reign of c. 480, the earliest date one of the poets influenced by Nonnus published his first work. This upper limit agrees with the date of the recently published coin.
