= Wazena of Axum =

King of Aksum from 550 to 570

Wazena
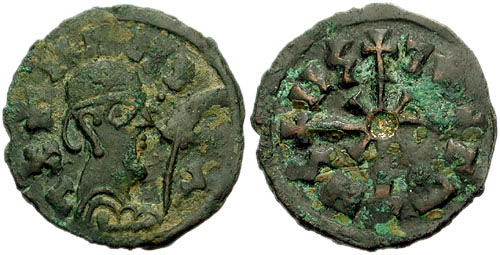

King of Aksum
- Reign: 550-570
- Predecessor: Alla Amidas
- Successor: W`ZB

Wazena (mid-6th century) was a King of the Kingdom of Aksum. He is primarily known through the Aksumite currency that was minted during his reign. Without any clear discussion, Stuart Munro-Hay identifies him with a king Alla Amidas, who is also known only through the coins he issued.

== Coinage ==
Two types of coins bear his name, one in silver, the other in copper. The silver issue bears the crowned bust of the king with the inscription in Ge'ez "King Wazena" on the obverse, a cross with a gilded punch hole center under an arch with the inscription in Ge'ez "The king who exhales the Savior." The copper issue bears a draped profile wearing a head-cloth and holding a stalk of wheat, sometimes topped by a cross with the inscription in Ge'ez "May this please the peoples" on the obverse, while the reverse bears a large cross crossed by an oblique cross with a gilded punch hole center and the inscription "of Wazena, of the King." The legend on the obverse may be a translation from the familiar Greek phrase "May this please the country" used on many earlier issues, the previous instance by Kaleb on his rare bronzes.

A king of Aksum issued three types of silver coins with crosses on the reverse inlaid with gold, who identified himself on two types only as "The king who exalts the Savior" (Za-Ya `Abiyo La Madkhen Negus); on the third type the name "Wazena" is added, suggesting these silver coins were also issued by Wazena. Munro-Hay notes the reverse "is quite new in the Aksumite numismatic repertoire, and foreshadows a design used frequently in manuscript design." Hahn and West note that this name "in conjunction with the luminous cross of the copper coins ... may have promoted the stories told in Ethiopia about a famous king called Gebre Maskal ("Servant of the cross").
