= Alla Amidas =

King of Axum from 547 to 550

- King of Axum
- Reign: late 5th century (traditional) late 530s–550s (numismatic dating)
- Predecessor: Saladoba (traditional); Kaleb (numismatic dating)
- Successor: Tazena (traditional); Wazena (numismatic dating)
- Issue: Tazena
- Father: Saladoba

Alla Amidas (c. 540) was a king of the Kingdom of Aksum. He is primarily known from the coins minted during his reign.

Based on die-links between the coins of Alla Amidas and Kaleb, Stuart Munro-Hay suggests that the two kings were co-rulers. Alla Amidas possibly ruled the Aksumite territories on the western side of the Red Sea, while Kaleb was campaigning in the east in Southern Arabia.

Some Ethiopian chroniclers claimed that it was during the reign of Alla Amidas that the Nine Saints came to Ethiopia.

== Coinage ==
Only gold coins bearing the name of Alla Amidas are known. These comprise one type with crowned and draped right-facing profile with a crown between two stalks of wheat within a circle on the obverse, and a right-facing profile with a head-cloth on the reverse; the legend on the obverse is his name in Greek ("AΛΛΑΑΜΙΔΑΣ"), and legend on the reverse is his title "King". A similar type where the name has been read in the past as "Allamiruis" ("ΑΛΛΑΜΙΡΥΙΣ") is now attributed to him.

Because no silver or copper coins are known bearing his name, and no gold coins bearing the name of Armah are known, expert consensus has identified the two as the same king, "Alla Amidas" being his throne name while "Armah" was his personal name.

== Traditional regnal lists ==
Both August Dillmann and Carlo Conti Rossini studied surviving Abyssinian regnal lists and grouped them into three (lists A–C) and eight (lists A–H) types respectively. Alla Amidas appears on the following lists:

Alla Amidas on traditional Ethiopian and Eritrean regnal lists
List	Predecessor	Successor	Statements and Notes	Ref.
Dillmann List A / Rossini List C	Agabe and Lewi (joint reign)	Yaqob and Dawit (joint reign)	Reigned for 11 years. A version of this list recorded by E. A. Wallis Budge records 14 years of rule.	
Dillmann List B / Rossini List B	Saladoba	Tazena	The Nine Saints came to Abyssinia during his reign.	
Dillmann List C / Rossini List A	Saladoba	Tazena		
Rossini List D	Arada	Tazena	A version of this list recorded by Pedro Páez places Saladoba between Arada and Alla Amidas.	
Rossini List E	Aladeb (Saladoba)	Tazena		
Rossini List G	Ela Adoba (Saladoba)	Tazena		

Apart from Dillmann's list A/Rossini's list C, the lists are consistent in naming Tazena as Alla Amida's successor and most name Saladoba as his predecessor. However, only the first list in the above table provides any reign lengths. List B explicitly dates the arrival of the Nine Saints to his reign, however at least one version of the list instead dates this event to the previous reign.

Two manuscripts, called the Gedle Aregawi and Gedle Pentelewon, explicitly state that Alla Amidas was the son of Saladoba and father of Tazena. The latter text also precisely dates the arrival of the Nine Saints to the sixth year of his reign. The Gedle Pentelewon states that the saints stayed for one year and nine months, while the Gedle Pentelewon states they stayed for nine years, three years during the reign of Alla Amidas and six years during the reign of his successor Tazena.

Ethiopian historian Sergew Selassie theorised that all of the saints, except Abba Pantelewon and Abba Liqanos, did not favour the accession of Tazena to the throne, and this is why they left Aksum, although the hagiographies preferred to claim they left because they wished to proselytize their religion.

The 1922 regnal list of Ethiopia dated Alla Amidas' reign to 478–486 (Ethiopian Calendar) and placed his reign between Saladoba and Tazena. However, Wolfgang Hahn and Vincent West dated his reign to the late 530s to 550s based on his coinage.

== Bibliography ==
- Budge, E. A. (1928). A History of Ethiopia: Nubia and Abyssinia (Volume I). London: Methuen & Co.
- Dillmann, August (1853). "Zur Geschichte des abyssinischen Reichs". Zeitschrift der Deutschen Morgenländischen Gesellschaft (in German). 7 (3): 338–364.
- Edwards, Frederick A. (1918). "The Early Kings of Axum". The Asiatic Review. 14: 438–503.
- Hahn, Wolfgang; West, Vincent (2016). Sylloge of Aksumite Coins in the Ashmolean Museum, Oxford. Oxford: Ashmolean. ISBN 9781910807101.
- Rey, C. F. (1927). In the Country of the Blue Nile. London: Camelot Press.
- Selassie, Sergew Hable (1972). Ancient and Medieval Ethiopian History to 1270. Addis Ababa.

Regnal titles
Preceded by Kaleb	King of Axum	Succeeded by Wazena
