= Ousas =

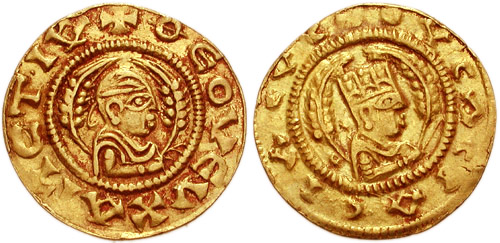
- A gold coin of the Aksumite king Ousas

King of Aksum
- Reign: c.500-514
- Predecessor: Nezool
- Successor: Kaleb
- Issue: Kaleb

Ousas, also Ousanas II (c. 500), was a king of the Kingdom of Aksum. He succeeded Nezool atop the throne.

Ousas is primarily known from the coins that were minted during his reign. Since the gold coins issued with this king's name closely resemble those of King Kaleb of Axum, Stuart Munro-Hay suggests that Ousas may be another name of Tazena, who is described both in Ethiopian tradition and on Kaleb's coins as his father.
