= Saifu =

Saifu (Chinese: 师傅. c. 577) was a ruler who figures in an Arab tradition preserved in a Chinese biography of Muhammad. Stuart Munro-Hay mistakenly thought that Saifu was a King of Axum.

== Life ==
Saifu is known from a chance mention in the biographical work The Real Record of the Last Prophet of Islam (Chinese: 天方至聖實綠), written between 1721 and 1724 by the Muslim scholar Liu Zhi. This work uses older materials that have been traced to a biography of the Prophet written by Sa'id al-Din Mohammed bin Mas'ud bin Mohammad al-Kazarumi, who died in 1357. According to this Chinese biography, the najashi of Abyssinia was said to have sent an ambassador with gifts to Muhammad's family upon sighting a star that announced his birth. When Muhammad turned seven years old, Saifu, described as the najashi's grandson, likewise sent gifts. This source also adds that Saifu was the grandfather of the najashi who gave shelter to Muslim immigrants around 615-6 in the Kingdom of Aksum. This began the spread of Islam into Ethiopia.

In reporting the contents of this "very tentative" source, Munro-Hay speculates how this genealogical relationship around Saifu might fit the known series of rulers in the later 6th century (identifying Saifu's grandfather with Kaleb, and his grandson with the Najashi), and appears to admit that these details are plausible.

However, Wolfgang Hahn notes that "Saifu is the well-known Saif bin Dhu Yazan who was probably a grandson of Sumuyafa Ashwa, the deputy-king installed by Kaleb in the Yemen, and he was in fact brought to power there in 577 aided by the Persians. There is no connection with Aksum at all." In the Sirat Sayf ibn Dhi-Yazan, this historical figure is said to have been raised in Ethiopia as the adopted son of the Negus.

The principal antagonist of the Sirat Sayf ibn Dhi-Yazan, a 15th century Arabic epic set during the Axumite conquest of Yemen, is also named Sayf Ar'ed. Likely inspired by the Negus due to his wars with neighboring Muslims, this reference to the emperor played a crucial role in dating the medieval work. The hero of the plot has the mission to redirect the waters of the Nile, held by the Ethiopians, back towards Egypt. This was doubtlessly inspired to the same threats made by contemporary emperors to the Mamluks, and that these conflicts were effectively anEgyptian proxy war.
