= Eon of Axum =

Eon
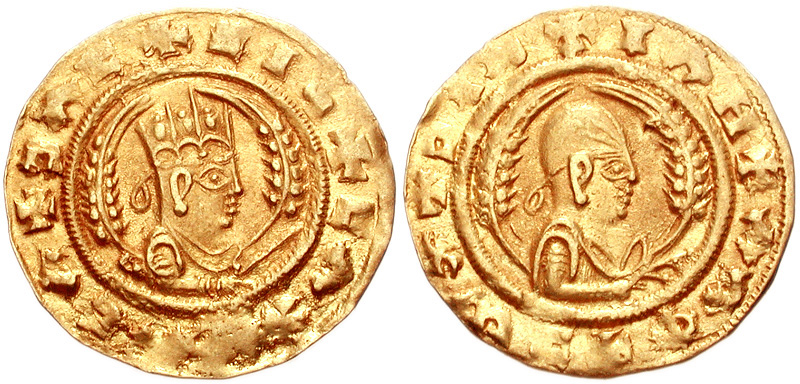

King of Aksum
- Reign: c.400-Mid 5th Century
- Predecessor: Ouazebas
- Successor: Ebana

Eon (c. 400 AD) was a King of the Kingdom of Aksum. He is primarily known through the coins minted during his reign, where his name is written in Greek as "Eon Bisi Anaaph". Only his coins issued in gold are known; many new examples were identified in the al-Madhariba hoard found in Yemen.

== Reign ==
While "bisi Anaaph" is usually understood to mean "man of Anaaph", Richard Pankhurst notes that the scholar Stephen Wright has argued the word bisi "might well be used in relation to the King's horse in the same way that Ethiopians of much later times used the word Aba. Sahle Sellassie, for example, was often known as Aba Dina (Dina being the name of his favorite horse)."

Eon may be the same person as the King Hiuna, who is mentioned in the Book of the Himyarites as leading a military expedition from Axum across the Red Sea into South Arabia; Stuart Munro-Hay notes that the "difference in spelling is no more than would result from transposing the name into the two languages concerned"; but he admits that the identification is not conclusive, or whether Hiuna was even a king.

== Coinage ==
Eon was the first King of Axum to use the mysterious legend + BAC + CIN + BAX + ABA on his coins, although part of this legend appeared on an earlier anonymous silver issue. Munro-Hay reports this has been interpreted to mean Basileus habasinon -- "King of the Habashat/Habash", a title used in South Arabian inscriptions to refer to the Axumite kings.
