= Gersem of Axum =

King of Aksum from c. 600 to 614

Gersem
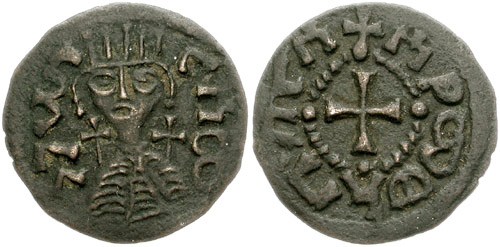

King of Aksum
- Reign: 600-614
- Predecessor: Israel
- Successor: Najashi

Gersem (c. 600) was a King of the Kingdom of Aksum in Northeast Africa. He is primarily known through the Aksumite currency that was minted during his reign.

Stuart Munro-Hay suggests that either Gersem or Armah were the last Aksumite Kings to issue coins. However, no gold coins belonging to Armah have been found, and the Gersem mint is assumed to be the last coin in gold.

Egyptologist E. A. Wallis Budge theorised that this king's named was influenced by the Biblical name Gershom.

== Place in Aksumite king list ==
The official king list of the Ethiopian monarchy from 1922 lists a similarly named king called "Germa Asfar" who reigned from 631 to 645 (Ethiopian Calendar). This could be the same king as Gersem based on dating, but the list names a different predecessor and successor for him, with Akala Wedem being the previous king and Zergaz being the next king. A manuscript held in the British Museum also states that a king named "Germa Safar" succeeded Akala Wedem and was succeeded by Zergaz. This list claims he was the 13th king to reign after Abreha and Atsbeha. A king list recorded by Egyptologist Henry Salt in 1814 also records a similar line of succession, although the king is called "Grim Sofar" instead of Germa or Gersem and is the 10th king to reign after Abreha and Atsbeha. Neither of these king lists provide reign dates.

Carlo Conti Rossini recorded a different king list in 1903 that stated that king "Germa Sor" was the 15th king after Abreha and Atsbeha and was preceded by Degzan and succeeded by Akala Wedem.

== Coinage ==
Several types of coins have been dated to Gersem's reign, minted in gold, silver and copper. There are two gold types: one has the king's bust wearing a crown on the obverse holding a hand-cross in his right hand with a single stalk of wheat on his left, while the reverse shows a profile of the king wearing a head-cloth between two barley stalks; the second also has the bust of the king on the obverse between two stalks of barley, while the reverse bears a rudimentary bust of the king between two barley stalks apparently holding one of the stalks in his right hand. Only one type of the silver is known, with the profile of the king holding a hand-cross on both sides, with the image on the obverse crowned while the image on the reverse wears a head-cloth. Two types of the copper issue have been identified: one, like the gold issue, with a crowned bust of the king on the obverse, but with crosses on his shoulders, while the reverse bears a cross surrounded by a circle of dots with the inscription "He conquers through Christ"; the second shows the profile of the king on both sides, but has little other identifiable details.
