= Kaleb of Axum =

King of Aksum from 514 to 542

Kaleb of Axum ካሌብ Ἐλεσβαᾶς τῆς Ἀξωμιτῆς
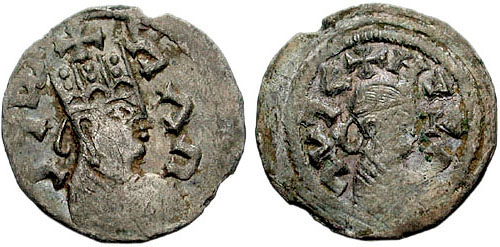
- Coin of the Axumite king Kaleb

King of Axum
- Reign: 514–534
- Predecessor: Ousas
- Successor: Gebre Meskel
- Born: Axum, Kingdom of Axum
- Issue: Israel; Gebre Meskel; Possibly Gebre Krestos (Gebru)
- Religion: Ethiopian Orthodox Tewahedo Church, Eritrean Orthodox Tewahedo Church

King Kaleb: Saint Elesbaan

King of Axum
- Venerated in: Oriental Orthodox Churches; Eastern Orthodox Church; Roman Catholic Church
- Feast: 24 October – Eastern Orthodox Church; 28 May – Ethiopian Orthodox; 27 October – Catholic Church (Note: "In Ethiopia, St. Elesbaan, king, who, after having defeated the enemies of Christ and sent his royal diadem to Jerusalem, in the time of the emperor Justin, led a monastical life, as he had vowed, and went to his reward.")

Kaleb (Ge'ez: ካሌብ, Latin: Caleb), also known as Elesbaan (Ge'ez: እለ አጽብሐ, Koine Greek: Ἐλεσβαᾶς), Ella Asbeha, or Hellestheaios, was King of Aksum, which was situated in what is now Ethiopia and Eritrea.

== Name ==
Procopius calls him "Hellestheaeus," a variant of the Greek version of his regnal name, Ge'ez: እለ አጽብሐ, romanized: ʾƎllä ʾAṣbəḥa (Histories, 1.20). Variants of his name are Hellesthaeus, Hellestheaios, Ellestheaeus, Eleshaah, Ellesboas, Elesbaan, and Elesboam.

At Aksum, in inscription RIE 191, his name is rendered in unvocalized Gə‘əz as klb ’l ’ṣbḥ wld tzn "Kaleb ʾElla ʾAṣbeḥa, son of Tazena". In vocalized Gə‘əz, it is ካሌብ እለ አጽብሐ (Kaleb ʾƎllä ʾÄṣbəḥä).

Kaleb, a name derived from the Biblical character Caleb, was his given name. On both his coins and inscriptions he left at Axum, as well as Ethiopian hagiographical sources and king lists, he refers to himself as the son of Tazena.

== Life ==
Procopius, John of Ephesus, and other contemporary historians recount Kaleb's invasion of Yemen around 520, against the Himyarite king Yūsuf As'ar Yath'ar, known as Dhu Nuwas, a Jewish convert who was persecuting the Christian community of Najran. After much fighting, Kaleb's soldiers eventually routed Yusuf's forces. They killed the king, allowing Kaleb to appoint Sumyafa Ashwa, a native Christian (named Esimiphaios by Procopius), as his viceroy of Himyar.

As a result of his protection of the Christians, Kaleb is known as Saint Elesbaan after the sixteenth-century Cardinal Caesar Baronius added him to his edition of the Roman Martyrology.

Aksumite control of West Yemen continued until c. 525 when Sumyafa Ashwa was deposed by Abraha, who made himself king. Procopius states that Kaleb made several unsuccessful attempts to recover his overseas territory; however, his successor later negotiated a peace with Abraha, where Abraha acknowledged the Axumite king's authority and paid tribute. Stuart Munro-Hay opines that by this expedition Axum overextended itself, and this final intervention across the Red Sea, "was Aksum's swan-song as a great power in the region."

It is also apparent that his reign was marked by a major integration of the Agaw tribes of what are today the districts of Wag and Lasta into his own kingdom. Cosmas Indicopleustes provides an important documentary confirmation for this. He makes a reference to the "governor of Agau", who was entrusted by Kaleb with the protection of the long-distance caravan routes from the south. According to Taddesse Tamrat, Kaleb's governor of Agau probably has his seat of government in the area of Lasta, which later serve as the center of the Zagwe dynasty.

A historical record survives of a meeting between the Byzantine ambassador and historian Nonnosus and Kaleb in the year 530.

Ethiopian tradition states that Kaleb eventually abdicated his throne, gave his crown to the Church of the Holy Sepulchre at Jerusalem, and retired to a monastery. Later historians who recount the events of King Kaleb's reign include ibn Hisham, ibn Ishaq, and al-Tabari. Taddesse Tamrat records a tradition he heard from an aged priest in Lalibela:

Kaleb was a man of Lasta and his palace was at Bugna where it is known that Gebre Mesqel Lalibela had later established his centre. The relevance of this tradition for us is the mere association of the name of Kaleb with the evangelization of this interior province of Aksum.

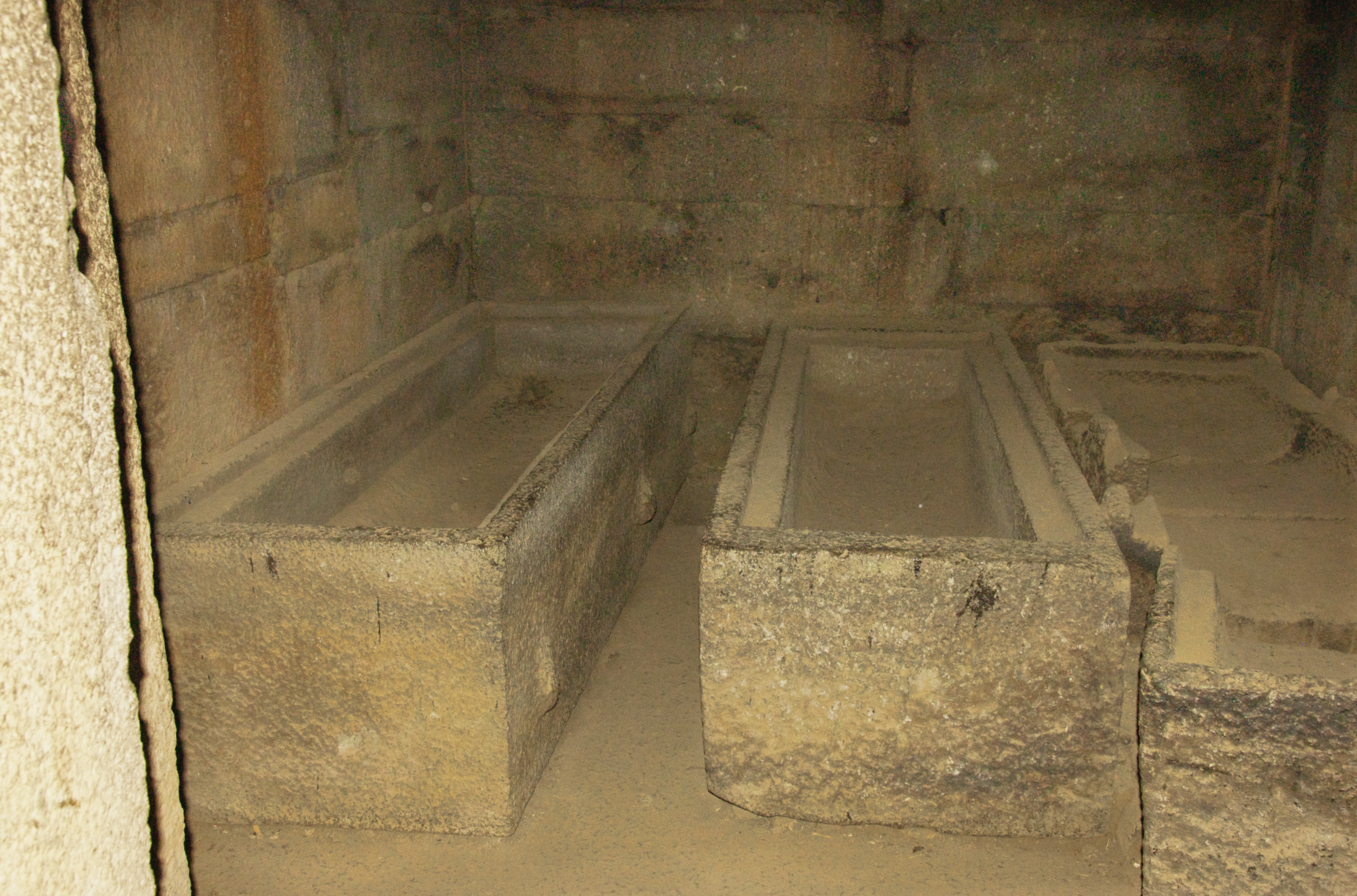
Two sarcophagi from Kaleb's tomb

Besides several inscriptions bearing his name, Axum also contains a pair of ruined structures, one said to be his tomb and its partner said to be the tomb of his son, Gabra Masqal. (Tradition gives him a second son, Israel, who, it has been suggested, is identical with king Israel of Axum.) This structure was first examined as an archaeological subject by Henry Salt in the early 19th century; almost a century later, it was partially cleared and mapped out by the Deutsche Aksum-Expedition in 1906. The most recent excavation of this tomb was in 1973 by the British Institute of Eastern Africa.

== Issue and successors ==
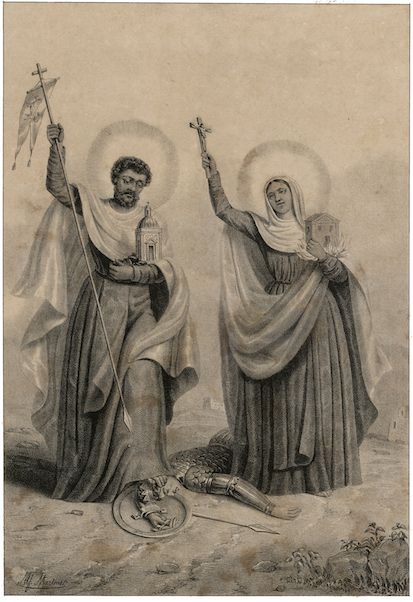
Brazilian painting of Saint Kaleb slaying the king of Himyar beside Ephigenia of Ethiopia. He carries a banner of the lion of judah holding a cross, attested in the late medieval period.

A combination of literary, numismatical and epigraphical sources mention three sons of Kaleb named Gebre Meskel, Israel and Gebre Krestos, who all reigned as kings after him. Gebre Meskel (or Gabra Maskal) appears on several official regnal lists as the successor of Kaleb. Israel is recorded via coins issued in his name when he ruled as king. Gebre Krestos appears on only one known regnal list under the abbreviated name of Gebru. A Ge'ez inscription written in Sabaean characters states "Man of Hadafen, Son of Ella Asbeha, Gebre Krestos". Some historians have suggested that "Gebre Krestos" could be the throne name of Gebre Meskel, but this has not been definitively proven.

Sources give contradictory accounts of the events following the end of the reign of Kaleb. One source stated that Za Israel, who was the eldest son of Kaleb and had been appointed by his father as Viceroy of Himyar, heard of his father's death and that his younger brother had taken the throne, leading to Israel taking an army to Ethiopia regain the throne for himself. The source does not say who was victorious, but does state the conflict was long-lasting. Another source claimed that it was Gebre Meskel who was Kaleb's oldest son but the throne was seized by his brother Beta Israel due to Gebre Meskel having been in Shewa at the time of his father's abdication. This angered Gebre Meskel, who wanted to go to war against Israel, but he was stopped by priests who told him to wait until they had asked his father who his preferred successor was. Kaleb confirmed his preferred successor was Gebre Meskel, and Israel dropped dead when the priests announced his decision. Another tradition claims that Israel instead went into hiding and took with him the Ark of St. Michael and the Chariot of the Ark of the Covenant and became leader of the Zar cult.

According to the Kebra Nagast Gebre Meskel was the youngest son of Kaleb and succeeded him to the throne after Kaleb retired to a monastery.

== See also ==
- Saifu
- Gregentios of Himyaritia

== Notes ==
Regnal titles
Preceded by Ousas	King of Axum	Succeeded by Alla Amidas
