= Stuart Munro-Hay =

British archaeologist and historian (1947–2004)

Stuart Christopher Munro-Hay (21 April 1947 – 14 October 2004) was a British archaeologist, numismatist and Ethiopianist. He studied the culture and history of ancient Ethiopia, the Horn of Africa region and South Arabia, particularly their history of coins.

Born in Northern Ireland, he was initially called Stuart Christopher H. McIlwrath, but took his mother's maiden name after his parents separated. Munro-Hay studied Egyptology at the University of Liverpool from 1970 to 1974. As a student and collaborator of Neville Chittick, he worked on the 1973-74 excavation project of the British Institute in Eastern Africa (BIEA) in Aksum, the capital of the late-antique Aksumite Empire. The excavations had to be cancelled due to the Derg's coup d'état in 1974, but Munro-Hay continued to dedicate his work to researching the history of Aksum, and in particular compiled a large collection of Aksumite coins. He completed his doctorate in 1978 at the London School of Oriental and African Studies (SOAS), supervised by the then BIEA chairman Laurence Kirwan, his thesis was titled A Reappraisal of the History and Development of the Aksumite State from Numismatic and Archaeological Evidence.

Munro-Hay taught at the universities of Khartoum (1977–1980), Nairobi (1980–1982), Edinburgh (1983–84) and Cambridge (1985–1987). He was then employed by the British Institute in Eastern Africa, on whose behalf he published the results of the excavations in Aksum. In the 1980s, he sold a large part of his collection of Ethiopian and South Arabian coins to the Ethiopian government. From 1991 he lived as a freelance archaeologist in Paris and Thailand. He died in the Northern Thai city of Chiang Mai.

== Select publications ==
- Excavations at Aksum; an account of research at the ancient Ethiopian capital directed in 1972–4 by the late Dr Neville Chittick. Memoirs of the British Institute in Eastern Africa. Vol. 10. British Institute in Eastern Africa. 1989.
- Aksum: an African Civilization of Late Antiquity. Edinburgh University Press. 1991.
- Co-edited with Marilyn Heldman, African Zion: the Sacred Art of Ethiopia. Yale University Press. 1993.
- Co-authored with Richard Pankhurst, Ethiopia. World Bibliographical Series. Vol. 179. Clio Press. 1995.
- Ethiopia and Alexandria: the Metropolitan Episcopacy of Ethiopia. Bibliotheca nubica et aethiopica. Vol. 5. Zaś Pan. 1997.
- Co-authored with Roderick Grierson, The Ark of the Covenant: True Story of the Greatest Relic of Antiquity. Weidenfeld & Nicolson. 1999.
- Ethiopia – The Unknown Land: a Cultural and Historical Guide. I.B. Tauris. 2002.
- Ethiopia and Alexandria II: the Metropolitan Episcopacy of Ethiopia from the Fourteenth Century to the zemana mesafint. Bibliotheca nubica et aethiopica. Vol. 9. Zaś Pan. 2005.
