= Al Nejashi Mosque =

Mosque in Negash, Tigray, Ethiopia

- مَسْجِد ٱلنَّجَاشِي
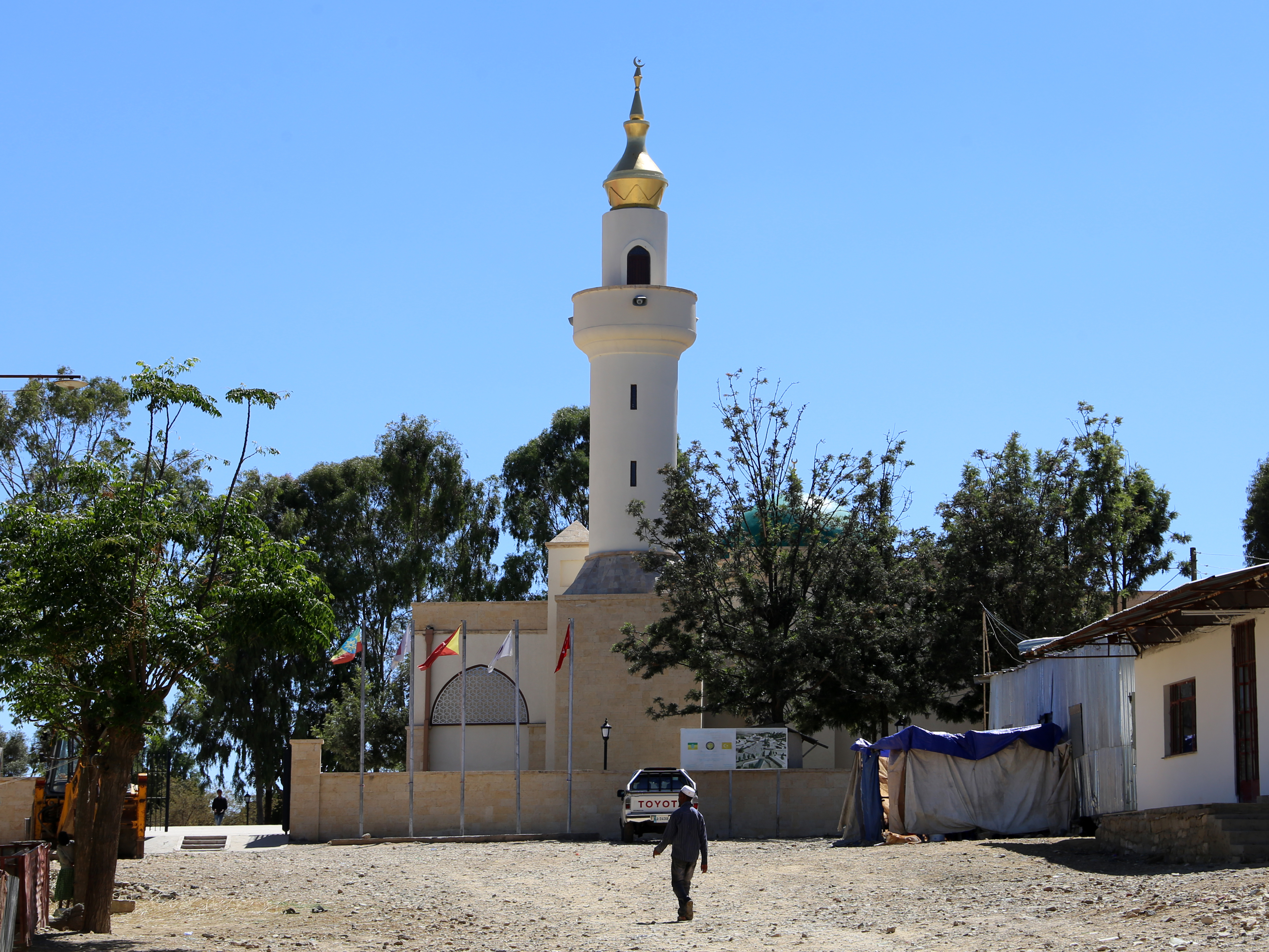

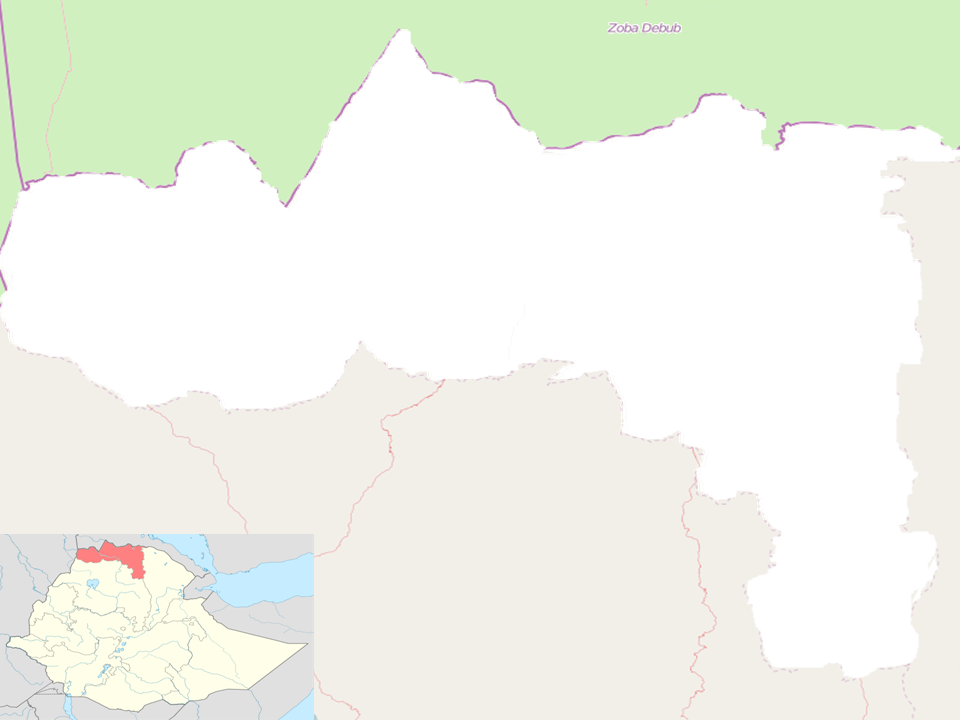
- Location of the mosque in Tigray

Religion
- Affiliation: Islam
- Ecclesiastical or organisational status: Mosque and mausoleum
- Status: Active

Location
- Location: Negash, Tigray
- Country: Ethiopia
- Interactive map of Al Nejashi Mosque
- Coordinates: 13°52′32.0″N 39°35′55.3″E

Architecture
- Type: Mosque
- Established: After 615 CE

Specifications
- Dome: 1
- Minaret: 1

Al Nejashi Mosque (Arabic: مَسْجِد ٱلنَّجَاشِي, romanized: Masjid an-Najāšī; Amharic: አል ነጃሺ መስጊድ, romanized: āli nejashī mesigīdi) is a mosque and mausoleum located in Negash, in the Tigray Region of Ethiopia.

== History ==
The mosque was established after 615 CE, when the first Muslims are said to have migrated to Abyssinia during the reign of Najashi. It is named after Najashi, a King of Aksum and Christian leader, who provided refuge for Muslim fleeing persecution.

In 2018, the mosque was renovated with funds from Turkish Cooperation and Coordination Agency (TIKA). Accommodations, visitor center and toilets were built around the mosque building that were completed by September 2018. In 2021, the mosque was damaged by fighting during the Tigray War. The minaret was destroyed, its dome partially collapsed and its façade was ruined. Soon afterwards, the Government of Ethiopia vowed to repair the building; and in 2024, TIKA announced further funding to complete the final stages of restoration. The restoration was completed during 2025.

== Tombs ==
The mosque complex features a tomb behind the main mosque building. There are 15 tombs attributed to the first immigrants in Islam to Ethiopia.

== See also ==
- Islam in Ethiopia
- List of mosques in Ethiopia
- List of the oldest mosques in Africa
