= Religion in Ethiopia =

Religion in Ethiopia (Pew Research Center 2020)
1. Christianity (61.6%)
2. Islam (36.2%)
3. Other (2.20%)

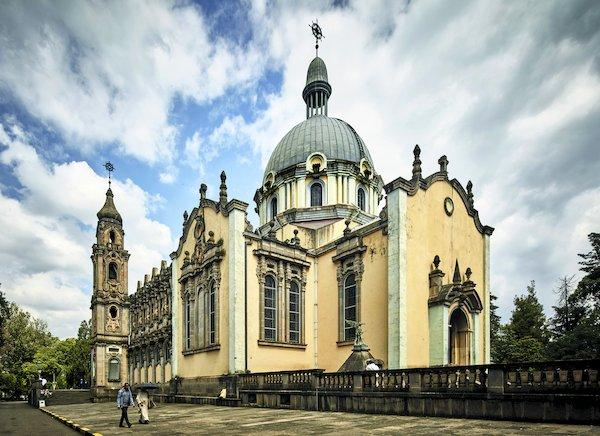
Holy Trinity Ethiopian Orthodox Cathedral in Addis Ababa. Ethiopia was one of the first regions in the world to adopt Christianity.

Religion in Ethiopia consists of a number of faiths. Among these mainly Abrahamic religions, the most numerous is Christianity (Ethiopian Orthodoxy, P'ent'ay, Roman Catholic, etc.) whose adherents collectively form 67.3% of the population, followed by Islam, adhered to by 31.3%. There is also a longstanding but small Ethiopian Jewish community. Some adherents of the Baháʼí Faith likewise exist in a number of urban and rural areas. Additionally, there is also a substantial population of the adherents of traditional faiths.

According to the national census conducted in 2007, over 32 million people or 43.5% were reported to be Ethiopian Orthodox Christians, over 25 million or 33.9% were reported to be Muslim, 13.7 million, or 18.6%, were P'ent'ay Christians, and just under two million or 2.6% adhered to traditional beliefs. Neither in the 2007 census, nor in the 1994 census, were responses reported in further detail: for example, those who identified themselves as Hindus, Jewish, Baháʼí, agnostics or atheists were counted as "Other".

The Kingdom of Aksum in present-day Ethiopia and Eritrea was one of the first Christian countries in the world, having officially adopted Christianity as the state religion in the 4th century.

== Geography ==
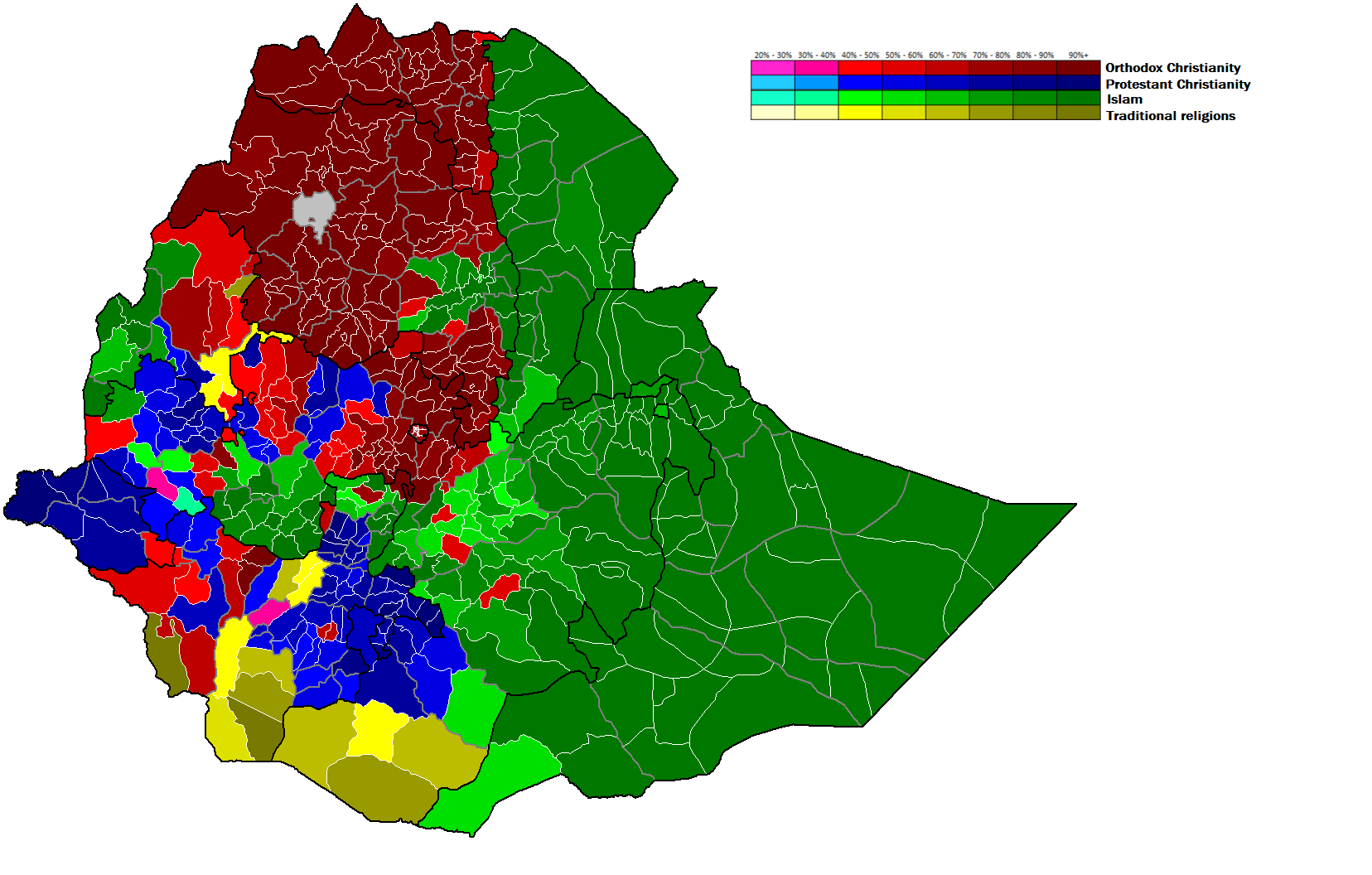
Map of dominant religion in Ethiopia by district according to the 2007 census

In general, most of the Christians (largely members of the non-Chalcedonian Ethiopian Orthodox Tewahedo Church) live in the highlands, while Muslims and adherents of traditional African religions tend to inhabit more lowland regions in the east and south of the country. The numerous indigenous African religions in Ethiopia operate mainly in the far southwest and western borderlands.

== Abrahamic religions ==
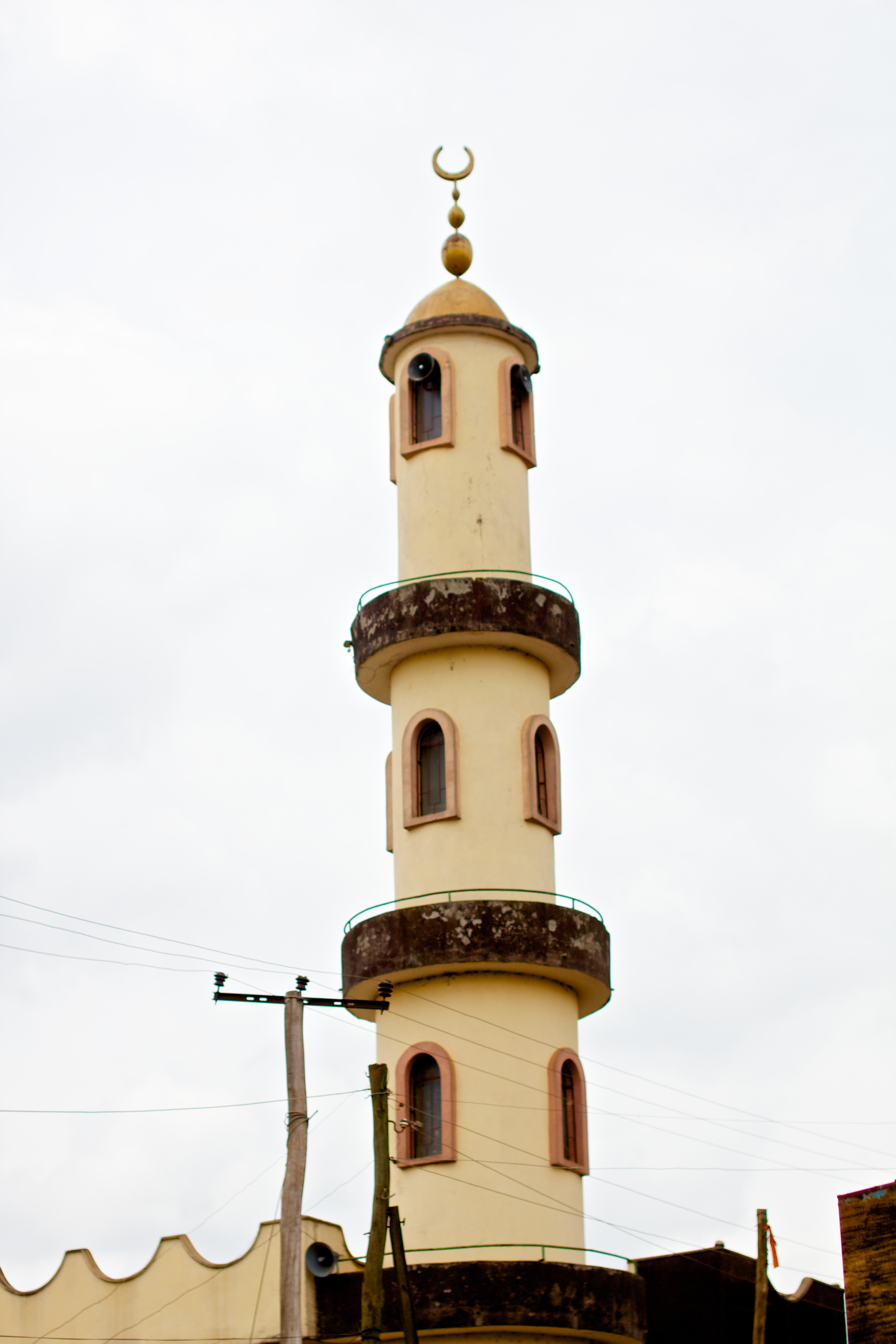
A mosque in Jimma

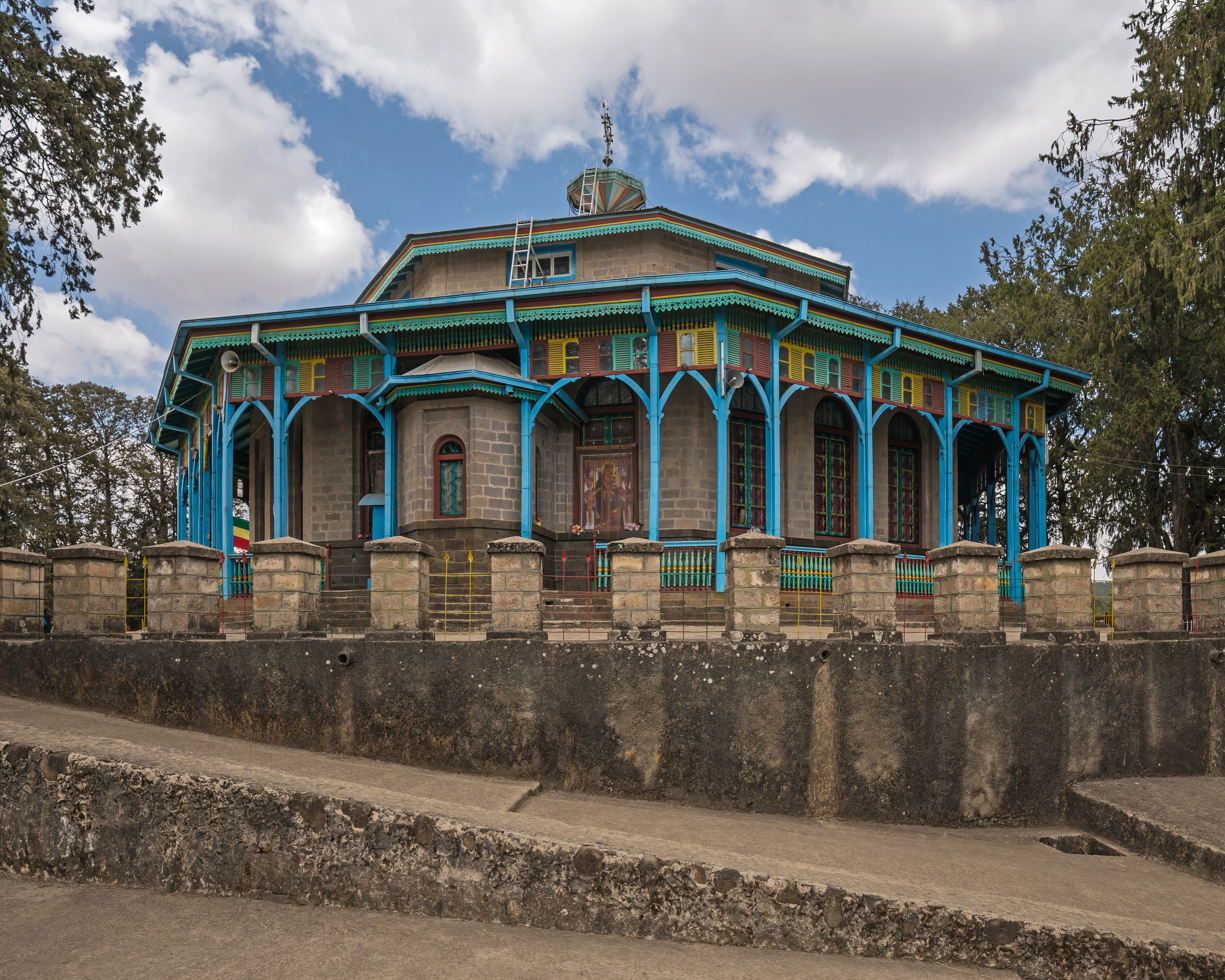
A church in Addis Ababa

Ethiopia has close historical ties to all three of the world's major Abrahamic religions. Christians form the majority of the population. Islam is the second most followed religion, with 36.2% of the population being adherents. 2.6% of the population (mainly in the far south and southwest) follow traditional religions; other religions (the Baháʼí Faith, Judaism, etc.) make up the remaining 0.6%. Ethiopia is the site of the first hijra in Islamic history and the oldest Muslim settlement in Africa at Negash. Until the 1980s, a substantial population of Ethiopian Jews resided in Ethiopia. The country is also the spiritual homeland of the Rastafari religious movement.

=== Christianity ===
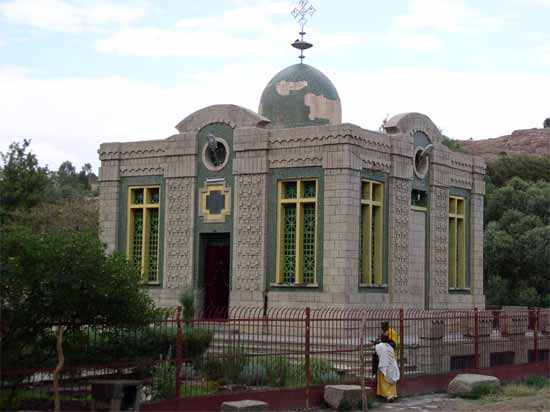
The Church of Our Lady Mary of Zion, rumored to hold the original Ark of the Covenant

Ethiopia is one of the oldest Christian states in the world. The Ethiopian Orthodox Church is an Oriental Orthodox Church, which is the largest Christian denomination in Ethiopia. It was part of the Coptic Orthodox Church until 1959, and is the only pre-colonial Orthodox church in Sub-Saharan Africa. The apostle St. Matthew is said to have died in Ethiopia. Christianity in Ethiopia dates back to the Aksumite Kingdom during King Ezana's rein.

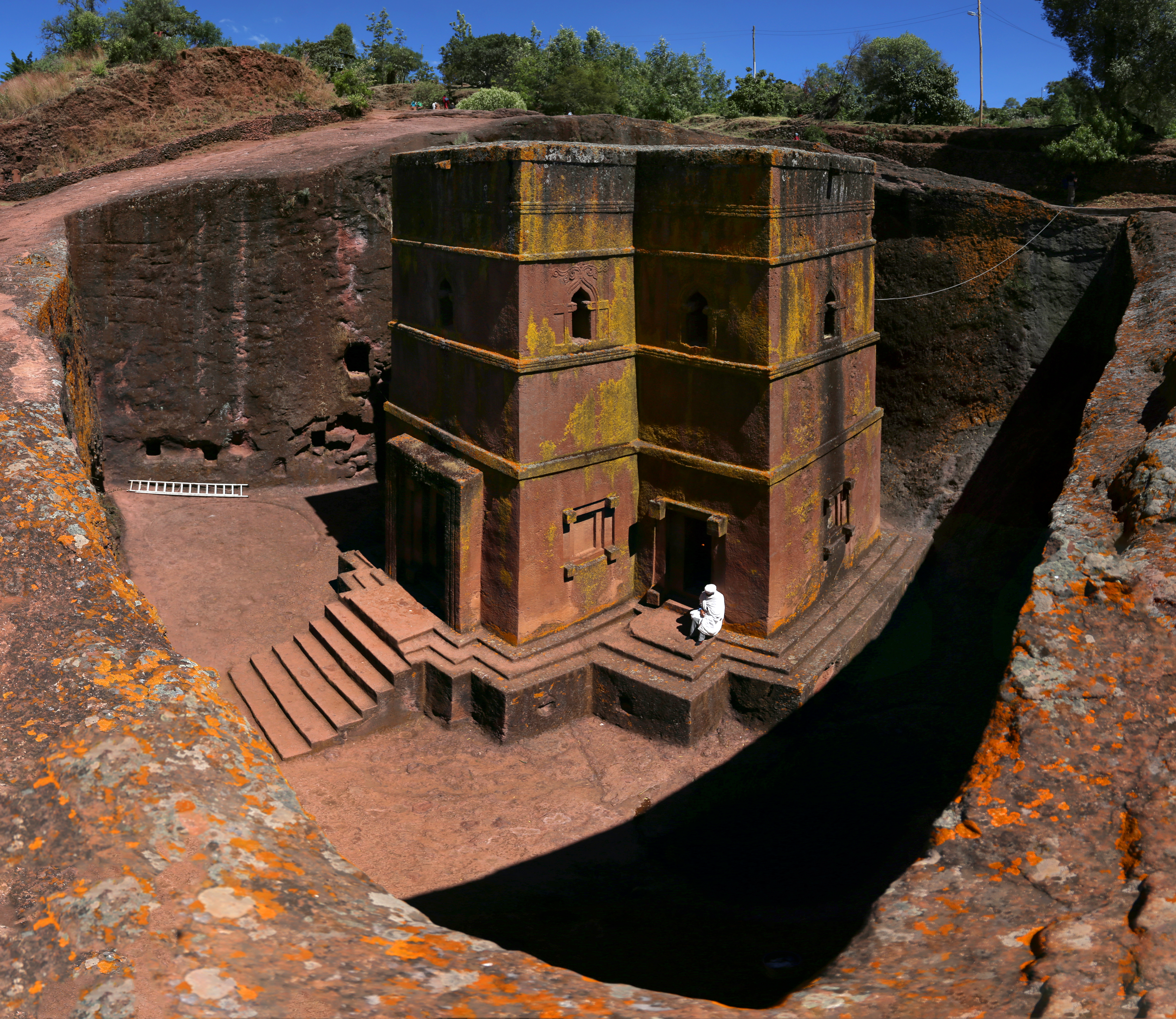
The rock-hewn Church of Saint George in Lalibela is a UNESCO World Heritage Site.

In 2016, the government stated that 67% of the country is Christian (44% of the population belonging to the Ethiopian Orthodox Church).

According to the government's 1994 census (which the CIA World Factbook follows), 61.6% of the Ethiopian population was Christian: 50.6% of the total were Ethiopian Orthodox, 10.1% were various Protestant denominations (such as and the Lutheran Ethiopian Evangelical Church Mekane Yesus), and Roman Catholics constituted 0.9% of the population).

Orthodox Ethiopian Christians are predominant in the Tigray (95.6%) and Amhara (82.5%), while the majority of Protestants live in the Southern Nations, Nationalities and Peoples Region or SNNPR (55.5% of the inhabitants) and the Oromia Region (4.8 million or 17.7%). According to the government's most recent census from 2007, Christians constitute 62.8% of the total population, with the largest group being Ethiopian Orthodox Christians at 43.5%, followed by Protestants 18.6% and Catholics at 0.7%. A 2015 study estimates some 400,000 Christian believers from a Muslim background in the country, most of them belonging to some form of Protestantism.

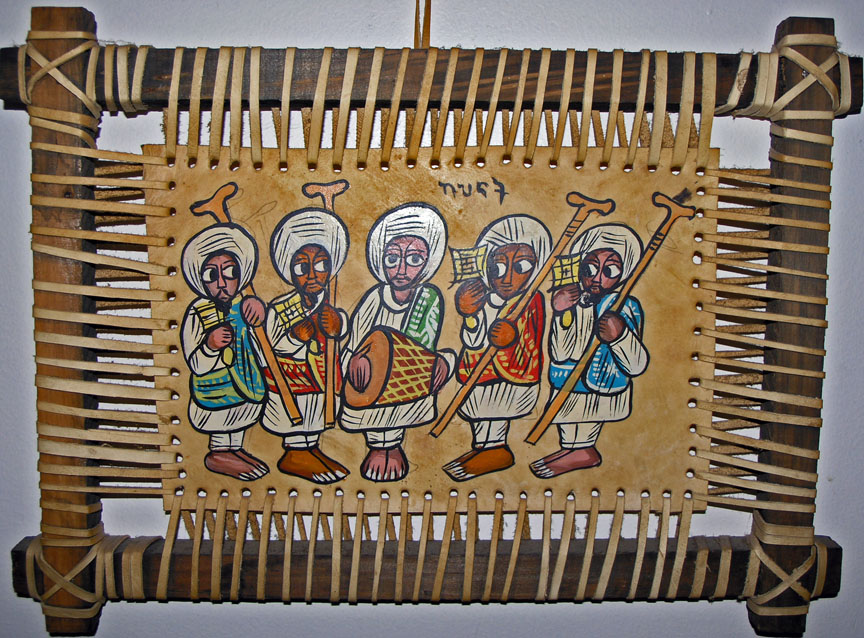
A leather painting depicting Ethiopian Orthodox Debteras playing sistra and a drum.

The Kingdom of Aksum was one of the first nations to officially accept Christianity, when St. Frumentius of Tyre, called Fremnatos or Abba Selama ("Father of Peace") in Ethiopia, converted King Ezana during the 4th century AD. Many believe that the Gospel had entered Ethiopia even earlier, with the royal official described as being baptised by Philip the Evangelist in chapter eight of the Acts of the Apostles (Acts 8:26–39). Orthodox Christianity has a long history in Ethiopia dating back to the 1st century, and is dominant in northern and central Ethiopia. Both Orthodox and Protestant Christianity have large representations in southern and western Ethiopia. A small ancient group of Jews, the Beta Israel, live in northwestern Ethiopia, though most emigrated to Israel in the last decades of the 20th century as part of the rescue missions undertaken by the Israeli government, Operation Moses and Operation Solomon. Some Israeli and Jewish scholars consider these Ethiopian Jews as a historical Lost Tribe of Israel. Today, the Ethiopian Orthodox Tewahedo Church, part of Oriental Orthodoxy, is by far the largest denomination, though a number of Protestants churches have recently gained ground. Since the 18th century there has existed a relatively small (uniate) Ethiopian Catholic Church in full communion with Rome, with adherents making up less than 1% of the total population.

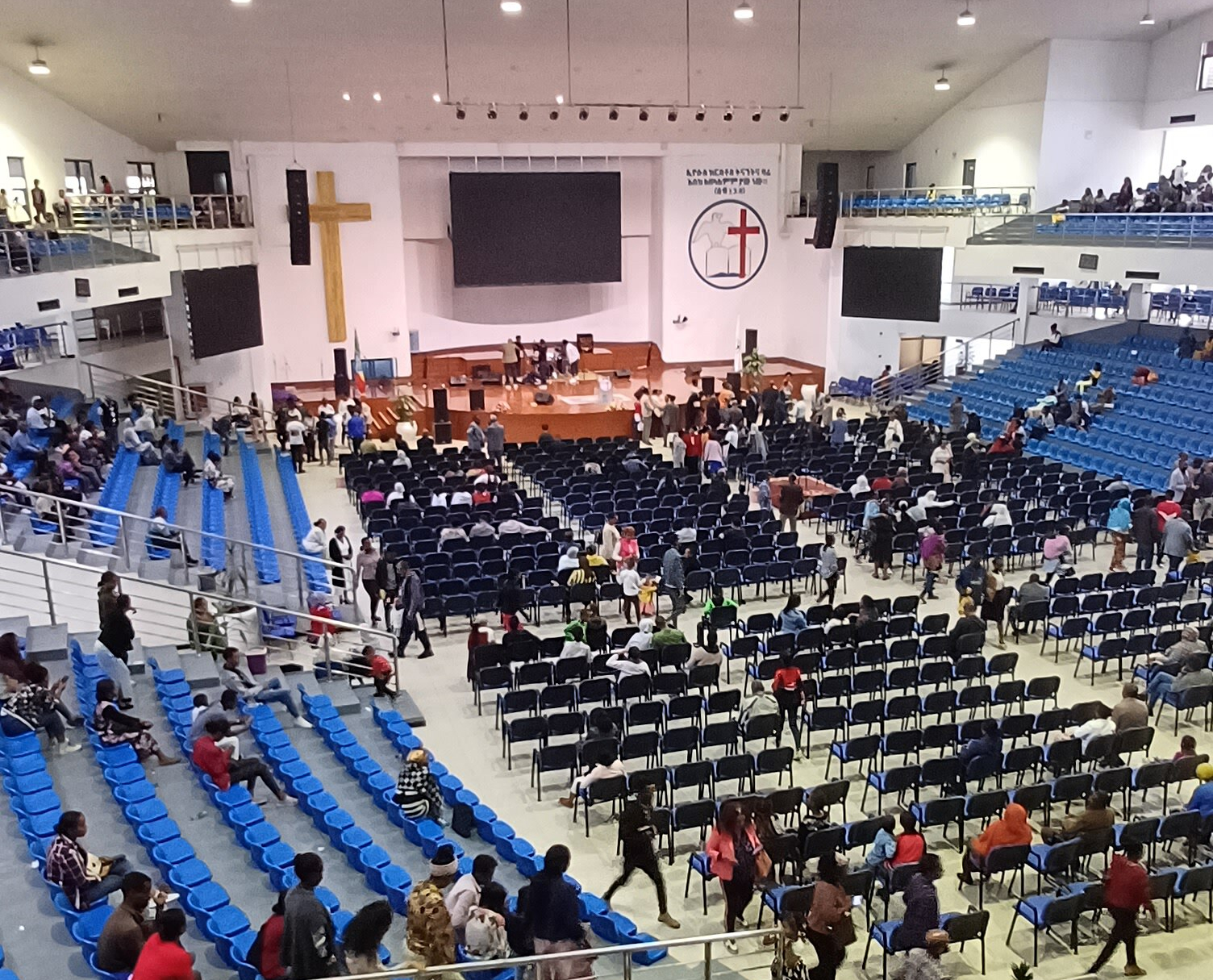
A modern charismatic megachurch in Ethiopia

The name "Ethiopia" (Hebrew Kush) is mentioned in the Bible numerous times (thirty-seven times in the King James version). Abyssinia is also mentioned in the Qur'an and Hadith. While many Ethiopians claim that the Bible references of Kush apply to their own ancient civilization, pointing out that the Gihon river, a name for the Nile, is said to flow through the land, some scholars believe that the use of the term referred to the Kingdom of Kush in particular, or Africa outside of Egypt in general. The modern name Ethiopia is from the Greek term Aethiopia used to translate Kush, and was applied to all of Sub-Saharan Africa, including what is now Sudan, but with a few classical geographers giving more detailed descriptions of present-day Ethiopia and Eritrea (e.g. Adulis) as well.

=== Islam ===
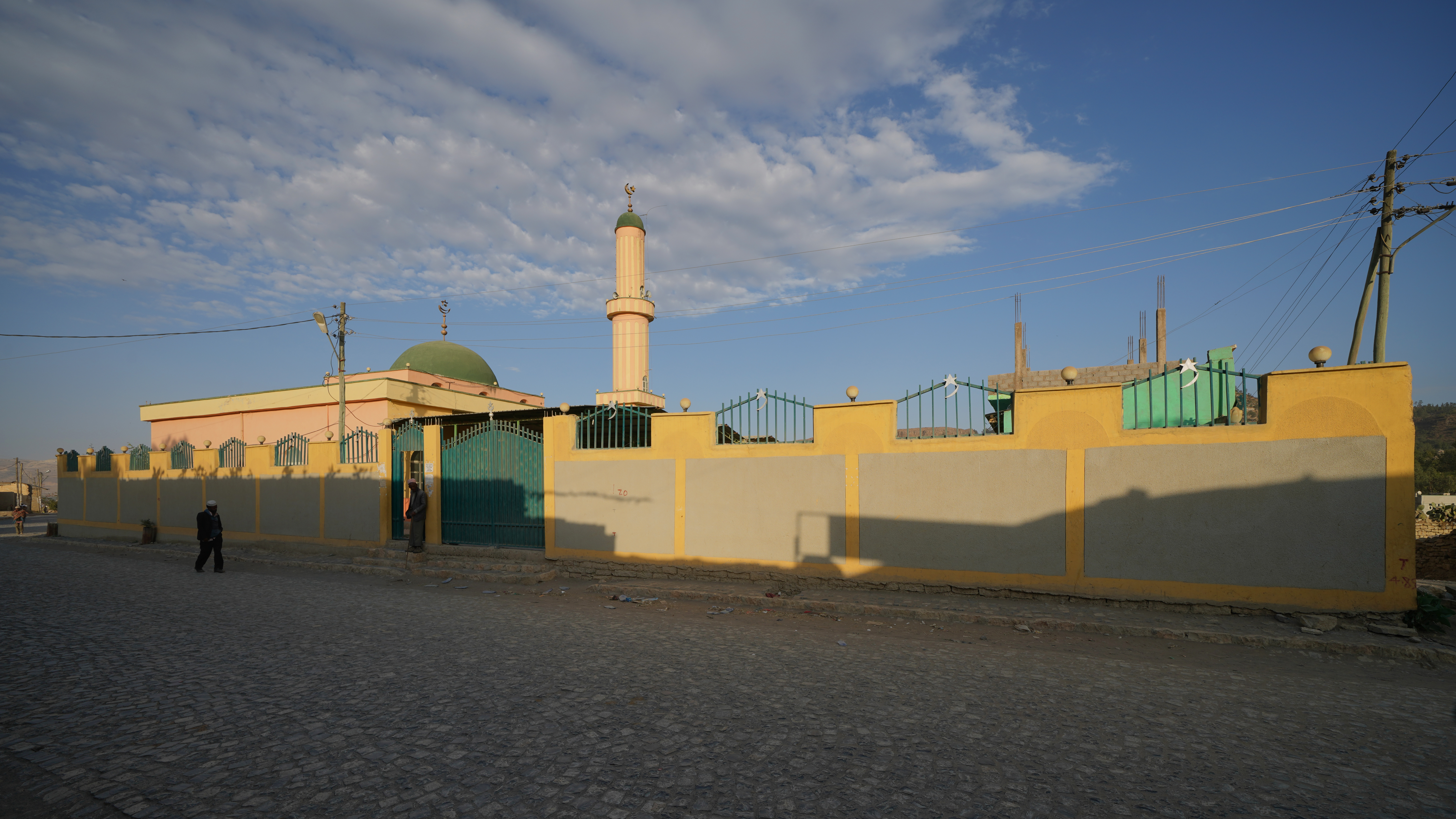
A mosque in Mekelle

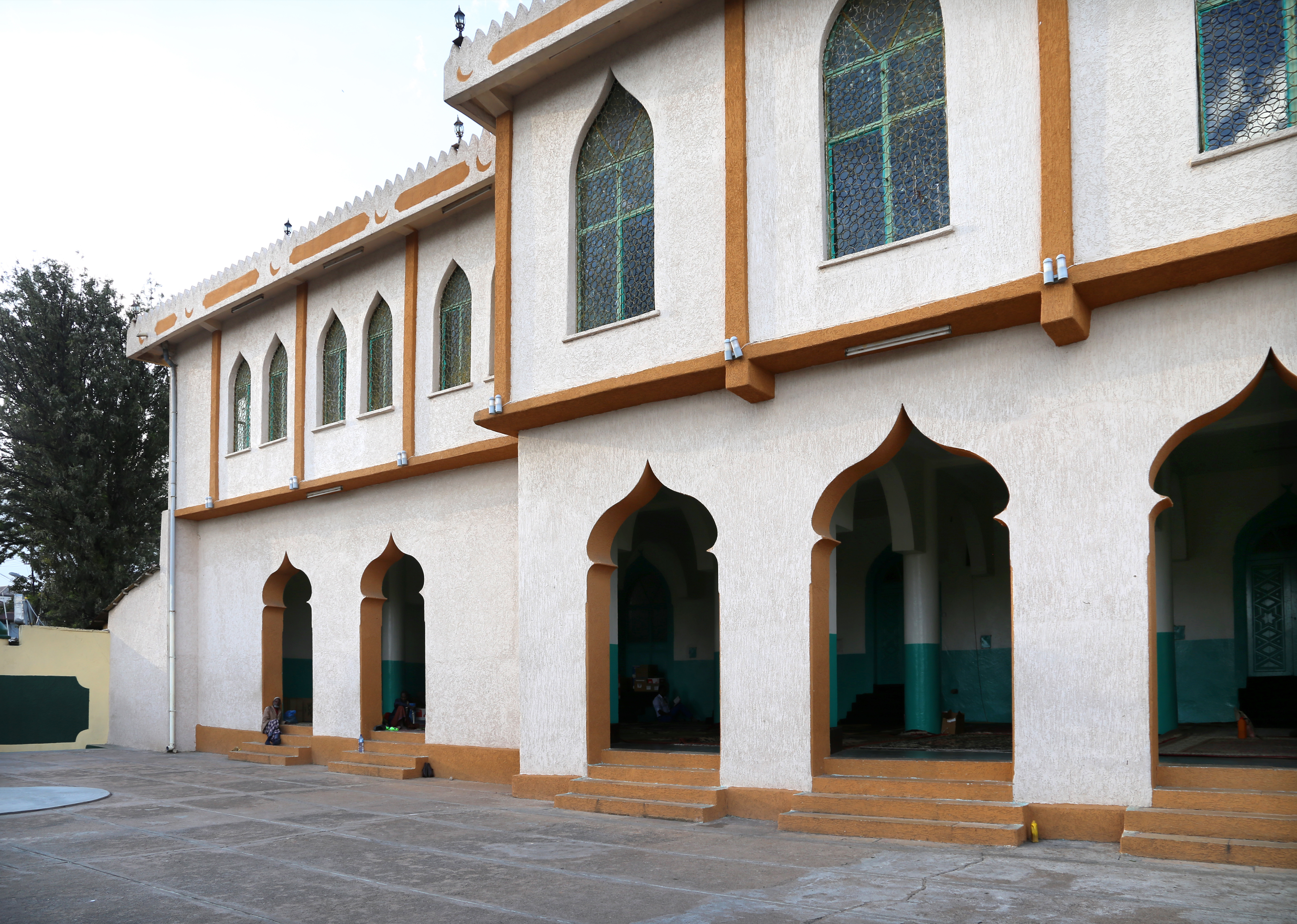
Jamia Mosque, Harar

Islam in Ethiopia dates back to the founding of the religion; in 615, when a group of Muslims were counseled by Muhammad to escape persecution in Mecca and travel to Ethiopia via modern-day Eritrea, which was ruled by Ashama ibn Abjar, a pious Christian king. Bilal ibn Ribah, the first Muezzin, the person chosen to call the faithful to prayer, and one of the foremost companions of Muhammad, was born in Mecca to an Abyssinian mother. Moreover, the largest portion of non-Arab companions of Muhammad belonged to Ethiopian ethnic groups.

According to the most recent 2007 CSA governmental data, Muslims are 33.9% of the population, up from 32.8% in 1994 (according to the census data of that year). Before the publication of the 2007 census results, however, the U.S. State Department estimated that "approximately 31% of the population is Sunni Muslim." According to a 2025 Pew Research Center report, Muslims made up 36.2% of Ethiopia's population in 2020.

Roughly 68% of Ethiopian Muslims are Sunni, whilst 23% are non-denominational Muslims, whilst another 2% adhere to other sects such as Shia, Quranist, Ibadi etc. and some belonging to various Sufi orders. Islam first arrived in Ethiopia in 614 with the First Migration to Abyssinia. Addis Ababa, Ethiopia's capital city, is home to about 443,821 Muslims or 16.2%. While Muslims can be found in almost every community, Islam is most prevalent in the Somali (98.4%), Afar (95.3%) and Oromia (47.5%) regions. Haile Selassie's government reportedly concealed the actual figures of the Muslim population in order to present Ethiopia as a Christian nation to the outside world. The writers of Ethiopia: a country study claimed that Islam made up 50% of the total population in 1991 based on the 1984 census commissioned by the Derg regime. Some web columnist even say the Muslim population are the majority and disagree with the current Ethiopian governments claims.

=== Judaism ===
Areas inhabited by the Beta Israel before their mass aliyah

The Beta Israel, also known as the Falashas (though this term is considered derogatory), are a long-isolated group of African Jews who have lived in Ethiopia since antiquity. Their existence was not widely known to the outside world for many years, and they likewise were not aware of other Jewish groups outside of their own community. They became known to the West during the 19th and 20th centuries, and were accepted as Jews by the Israeli government in 1975. After this, Operation Moses and Operation Solomon, conducted in 1984 and 1991, respectively, airlifted the vast majority of the Ethiopian Jewish population to Israel, where there is currently a population of 150,000 Beta Israel. A small Jewish community still exists in Ethiopia, although it is mostly composed of Falash Mura, Ethiopian Jews who converted to Christianity in the past, and as such have not been recognized as Jews by the State of Israel, but have returned to Judaism (the Falash Mura now number some 22,000).

=== Baháʼí Faith ===
The Baháʼí Faith in Ethiopia begins after `Abdu'l-Bahá wrote letters encouraging taking the religion to Africa in 1916. Mr. Sabri Elais, then a 27-year-old Bahá'í from Alexandria, Egypt, introduced the Baháʼí Faith to Ethiopia in 1933. A year later, in November 1934, the first Baháʼí Local Spiritual Assembly in the country was formed in Addis Ababa. In 1962, Ethiopia Baháʼís elected a National Spiritual Assembly. By 1963, there were seven localities with smaller groups of Baháʼís in the country. The Association of Religion Data Archives estimated that there were around 23,000 Baháʼí adherents in 2010. The Ethiopian community celebrated its diamond jubile in January 2009. As of 2016 the largest Baháʼí community is in Addis Ababa. A number of towns (such as Awassa, Nazareth, Mekele, Succano and Shashemenie) and rural areas in Oromia and the Southern Nations, Nationalities, and People's Region (SNNPR) have active and growing Baháʼí communities.

== Traditional faiths ==
An estimated 2.6% of Ethiopia's population adheres to various traditional faiths, according to the 2007 census (down from 4.6% in the 1994 census data). The largest numbers of practitioners of traditional religions are in the SNNPR (about 993,000 people) and Oromia (895,000).

== Views on the emperors ==
Ethiopia is the spiritual homeland of the Rastafari movement, whose adherents believe Ethiopia is Zion. The Rastafari view Emperor Haile Selassie as Jesus, the human incarnation of God. The Emperor himself was the defender of the Ethiopian Orthodox Church, that also has a concept of Zion, although it represents a unique and complex concept, referring figuratively to St. Mary, but also to Ethiopia as a bastion of Christianity surrounded by Muslims and other religions, much like Mount Zion in the Bible. It is also used to refer to Axum, the ancient capital and religious centre of Ethiopian Orthodox Christians, or to its primary church, called Church of Our Lady Mary of Zion.

== Freedom of religion ==
In 2022, the country was scored 1 out of 4 for religious freedom by Freedom House. Local conflicts have included violence along religious lines.

In the same year, it was ranked as the 39th worst country in the world to be a Christian.

=== Religious politics and tensions ===
Freedom of religion is provided by the constitution of 1995, and freedom of worship had also been guaranteed by the 1930 and 1955 Constitutions of Ethiopia, although in certain localities this principle is not always respected in practice. There is no state religion, and it is forbidden to form political parties based upon religion; all religious groups are required to register with the government, and renew their registration once every three years. It is a crime in Ethiopia to incite one religion against another. Ethiopian Orthodox Tewahedo Church published works by an unknown author written in Ge'ez and translated to Amharic in 1986 which claimed Habesha should refrain from sexual intercourse with Oromo, Muslims, Shanqella, Falasha and animals because it was an abomination. Discrimination against Muslims has been rampant since the creation of modern Ethiopia, Muslims were marginalized in the Haile Selassie era which led to the 1974 Ethiopian Muslim protests. Haile Selassie actually came to power during the rise of opposition to Muslims in government positions. During the late 1960s, merely 2 out of 68 senior government officials were Muslim, consisting of one Somali and one Harari. Former house speaker Dawit Yohannes stated parties were denied EPRDF membership due to their Muslim links. U.S ambassador David H. Shinn stated in 2005 that the Ethiopian leadership continued to be largely Christian. Tension between Christian and Muslim Oromo were witnessed during the 2005 Ethiopian general election, when Muslim Arsi Oromo denounced the Shewa Oromo for participating in political nepotism. There is some tension between members of the Ethiopian Orthodox Church and Protestant Christians, as well as between the Ethiopian Orthodox and Muslims in general. According to the Barnabas Fund, 55 churches were torched in March 2011 in the Jimma Zone by Muslims after a dispute. In December 2019 several mosques and Muslim owned businesses were attacked in the Christian dominated Amhara Region.

Human rights groups have regularly accused the government of arresting activists, journalists and bloggers to stamp out dissent among some religious communities. Lengthy prison terms were handed to 17 Muslim activists on 3 August 2015 ranging from 7 to 22 years. They were charged with trying to create an Islamic state in the majority Christian country. All the defendants denied the charges and claimed that they were merely protesting in defence of their rights.

=== Orthodox Christian–Muslim relations ===
In the Hadith, Prophet Mohammed explicitly prohibited jihad against the Abyssinians as long as they were not hostile to Muslims. This is because Abyssinia's (present-day Ethiopia) Aksumite monarch embraced a group of Muslims embarking on the first Hijrah from Arabia, fleeing persecution from their homeland. The founder of Solomonic dynasty, Yekuno Amlak was heavily assisted by Muslim Sultanate of Showa in his struggle against the Zagwe dynasty. Yekuno Amlak paid back this favor when the Sultan of Shewa appealed to him to put down an insurrection in Showa.

These friendly and collaborative relations between Muslim and Christian states would soon deteriorate in the following centuries. In the early fourteenth century Emperor Amda Seyon launched a crusade against the neighboring Muslim state of Ifat Sultanate, several mosques were demolished. In the early fifteenth century Emperor Zara Yaqob invaded the Muslim state of Hadiya Sultanate and married the captured Hadiya princess Eleni which was condemned by Muslims. In the late fifteenth century Adal Sultanate invaded Abyssinia led by Imam Mahfuz, his defeat brought about the early 16th century Jihad of the Adalese Imam Ahmad ibn Ibrahim against Ethiopia, where several churches were demolished. In the nineteenth century during the reign of emperors Tewodros II, Yohannes IV and Menelik II, numerous Muslims were forced to convert to Christianity or displaced from their homelands. Muslims were furthermore treated as second class citizens and restrictions were put in place on how they could practice their religion.

== Adherents ==
=== Census ===
| Year | Christians | | | | Muslims | Traditional faiths | Other |
| Year | Total | Ethiopian Orthodox | Protestants | Catholics | Muslims | Traditional faiths | Other |
|---|---|---|---|---|---|---|---|
| 1994 | 61.6% | 50.6% | 10.1% | 0.9% | 32.8% | 4.6% | 1.0% |
| 2007 | 62.8% | 43.5% | 18.6% | 0.7% | 33.9% | 2.6% | 0.7% |
| Growth | 1.2% | −7.1% | 8.5% | −0.2% | 1.1% | −2.0% | −0.3% |

| Year | Christians | | | | Muslims | Traditional faiths | Other |
| Year | Total | Ethiopian Orthodox | Protestants | Catholics | Muslims | Traditional faiths | Other |
|---|---|---|---|---|---|---|---|
| 1994 | 32,689,482 | 26,844,932 | 5,366,360 | 478,190 | 17,406,087 | 2,444,085 | 531,323 |
| 2007 | 46,420,822 | 32,154,550 | 13,748,842 | 517,430 | 25,058,373 | 1,921,881 | 517,430 |
| Growth | 13,731,340 | 5,309,618 | 8,382,482 | 39,240 | 7,652,286 | -522,204 | -13,893 |

| | 1994 | 2007 | 1994 | 2007 | 1994 | 2007 | 1994 | 2007 | 1994 | 2007 | 1994 | 2007 | 1994 | 2007 |
| Region | Christians | | Ethiopian Orthodox | | Protestants | | Catholics | | Muslims | | Traditional faiths | | Other | |
|---|---|---|---|---|---|---|---|---|---|---|---|---|---|---|
| Addis Ababa | 86.65% | 83.0% | 82.0% | 74.7% | 3.9% | 7.8% | 0.8% | 0.5% | 12.7% | 16.2% | | | | 0.8% |
| Afar | 4.4% | 4.7% | 3.9% | 3.9% | 0.4% | 0.7% | 0.1% | 0.1% | 95.6% | 95.3% | | | | |
| Amhara | 81.6% | 82.7% | 81.5% | 82.5% | 0.1% | 0.2% | | | 18.1% | 17.2% | | | | 0.1% |
| Benishangul-Gumuz | 40.6% | 46.5% | 34.8% | 33.0% | 5.8% | 13.5% | | | 44.1% | 45.4% | 13.1% | 7.1% | | |
| Dire Dawa | 36.7% | 28.8% | 34.5% | 25.7% | 1.5% | 2.8% | 0.7% | 0.4% | 63.2% | 70.9% | | | 0.1% | 0.3% |
| Gambela | 71.35% | 90.2% | 24.1% | 16.8% | 44.0% | 70.0% | 3.2% | 3.4% | 5.15% | 4.9% | 10.3% | 3.8% | | 1.1% |
| Harari | 39.49% | 30.8% | 38.1% | 27.1% | 0.9% | 3.4% | 0.5% | 0.3% | 60.3% | 69.0% | | | | 0.2% |
| Oromia | 49.9% | 48.2% | 41.3% | 30.5% | 8.6% | 17.7% | | | 44.3% | 47.5% | 4.2% | 3.3% | | 1.1% |
| Somali | 0.9% | 0.5% | 0.9% | 0.6% | | | | | 98.7% | 98.4% | | | 0.3% | 1.0% |
| SNNPR | 65.4% | 77.8% | 27.6% | 19.9% | 34.8% | 55.5% | 3.0% | 2.4% | 16.7% | 14.1% | 15.4% | 6.6% | | 1.5% |
| Tigray | 95.9% | 96.1% | 95.5% | 95.6% | | 0.1% | 0.4% | 0.4% | 4.1% | 4.0% | | | | |

=== 2024 ===
According to research conducted by Afrobarometer in 2024, 40.1% of the population adhered to Oriental Orthodox Churches, 22.1% to some form of Protestantism, and 0.5% to Roman Catholicism, totaling 62.7% Christians. 36.9% were Muslims, 0.2% adhered to traditional African religions, 0.1% adhered to other religions, and 0.1% had no religion.

== See also ==
- Baháʼí Faith in Ethiopia
- Buda (folklore)
- Catholic Church in Ethiopia
- Christianity in Ethiopia
- Demographics of Ethiopia
- Ethiopian Catholic Church
- Ethiopian Jews
- Ethiopian Orthodox Tewahedo Church
- Islam in Ethiopia
- Ethiopian Evangelicalism
- Zār
