= Islam in Ethiopia =

Total population
- 43,100,000 (2020)

Regions with significant populations
- Somali (98.4%), Afar (95.3%), Dire Dawa (70.9%), Harari (69%), Oromia (47.5%), Benishangul-Gumuz (45.4%)

Religions
- Sunni Islam

Islam is the second largest religion in Ethiopia behind Christianity. In 2024, 31.5% of the population was Muslim.

Islam first appeared in Ethiopia during the time of Prophet Muhammad; in 615, when a group of Muslims were counselled by Muhammad to escape persecution in Mecca and migrate to the Kingdom of Aksum, which was based in Ethiopia and which was ruled by Najashi, a pious Christian king. It is agreed by Islamic scholars that Najashi gave shelter to the Muslim refugees around 615–616 at Axum. Bilal ibn Ribah, the first muezzin (the person chosen to call the faithful to prayer) and one of the foremost companions of Muhammad, was born in Mecca to an Abyssinian (Ethiopian) mother.

Simultaneously, historians emphasize that Islam was introduced to Ethiopia through trade networks, not solely this migration. Scholarly exchange, as well as merchant activity, was heavily present in eastern Ethiopia and was cultivated for centuries.

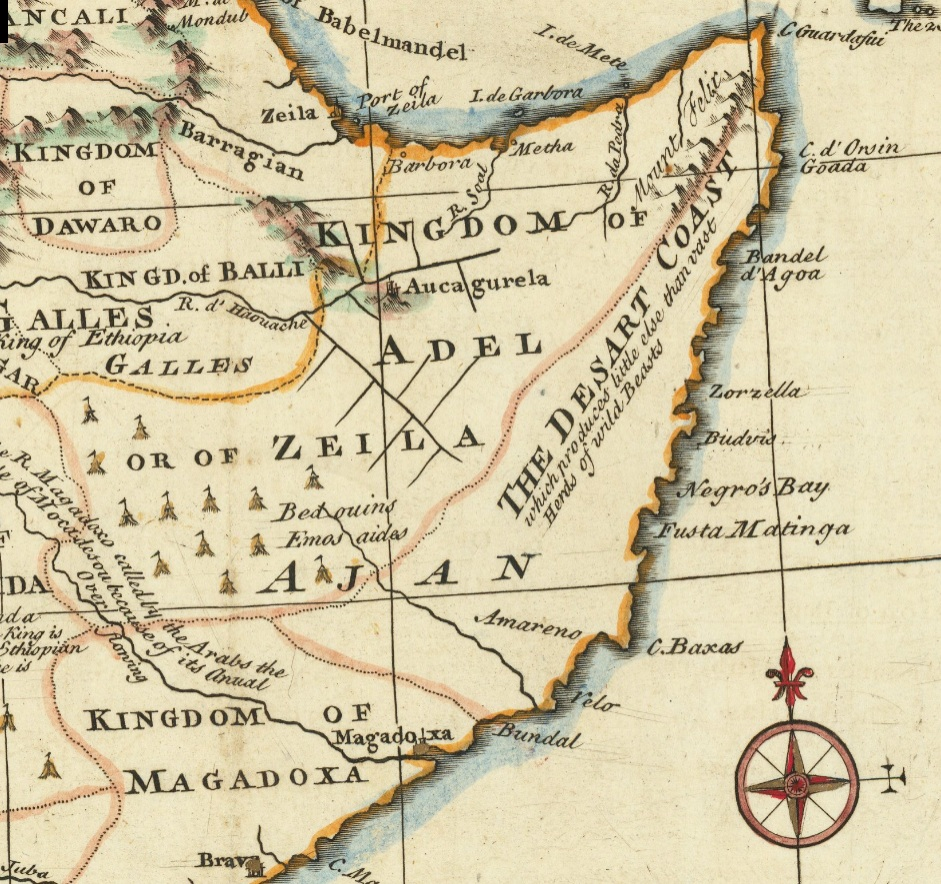
A map of Zeila and Adal, Somali regions and ports that introduced Islam into the Horn of Africa, including Ethiopia.

Many trade networks likely brought Islam in this direction, such as the Red Sea ports like Zeila and Massawa, but also the Indian Ocean trade network. Traders and migrants from the Afar Region and Adal Sultanate brought Islam inland, where religious teachers reinforced the religion. Islam in Ethiopia developed a blended faith, emphasis spiritual elements and co-existing with cultural traditions.

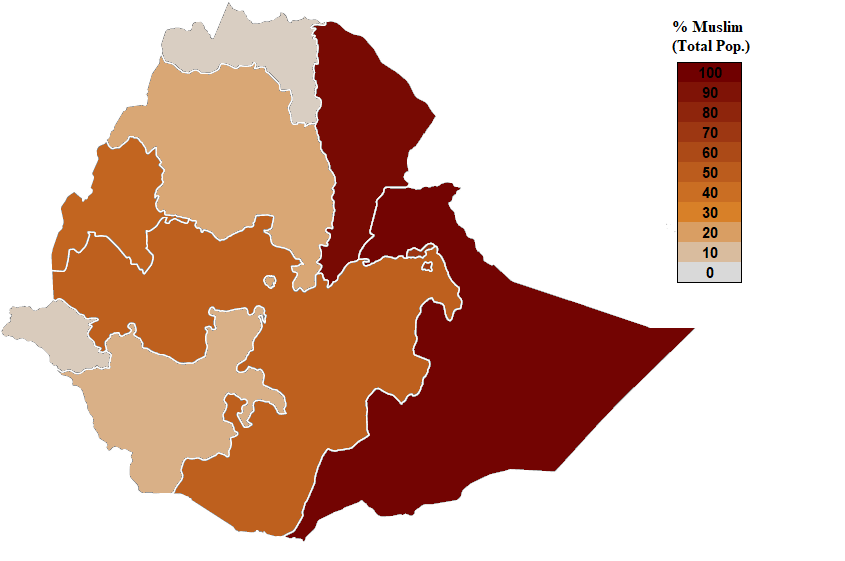
Distribution of Muslims in Ethiopia (2007)

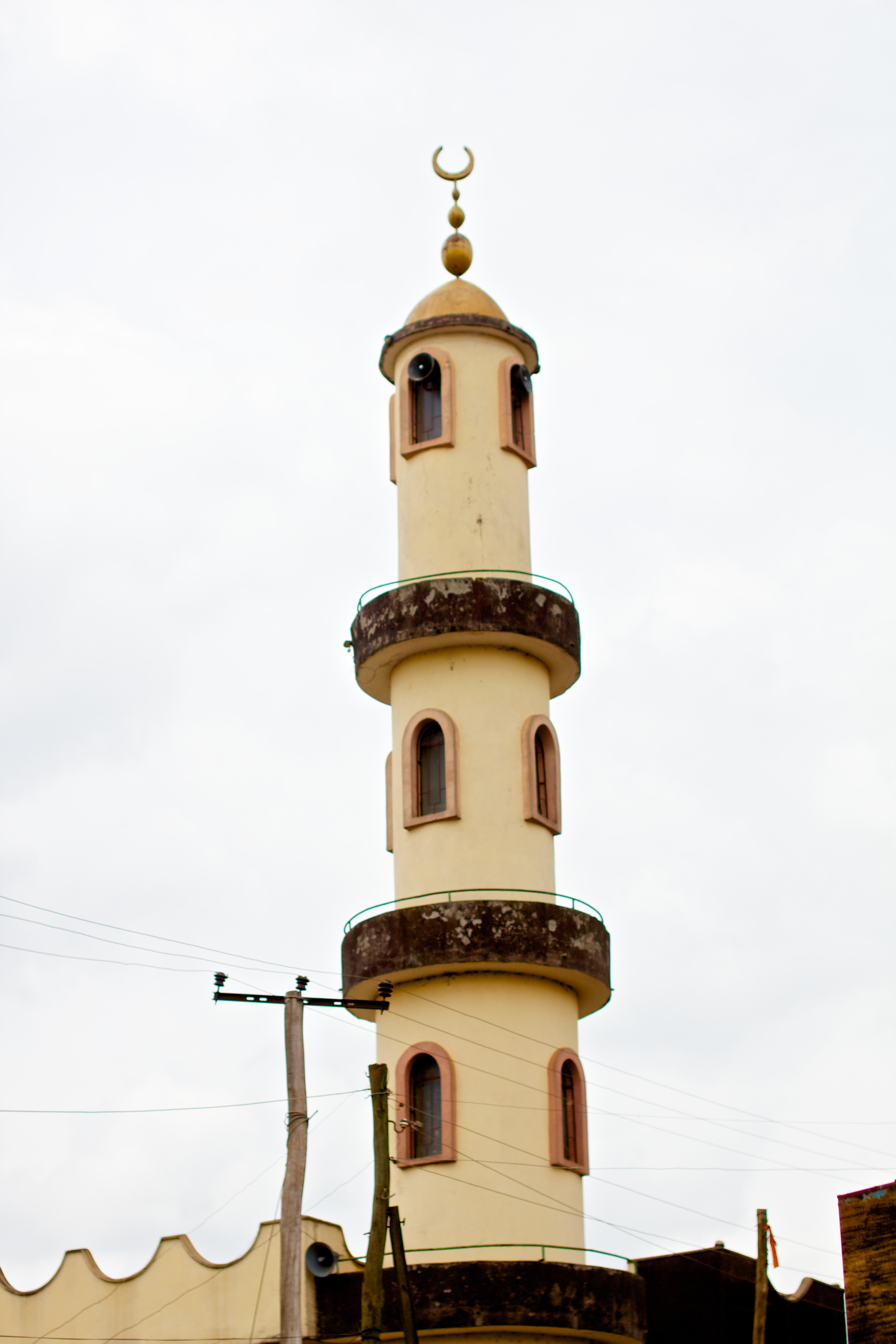
A mosque in Jimma

The Kingdom of Aksum in Ethiopia was the first foreign country to accept Islam when it was unknown in most parts of the world. The kingdom also favoured its expansion and making Islam present in the country since the time of Muhammad (571–632). Islam and Christianity are the two major religions and have co-existed for hundreds of years.

== History ==
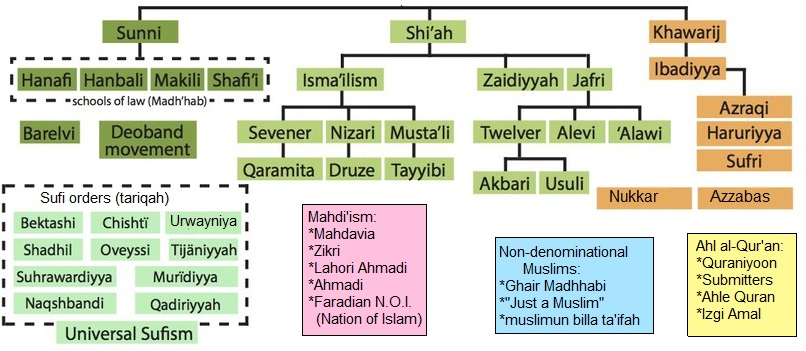
Many diverse forms of Islam are practised in Ethiopia.

Muslims arrived in the Axumite Empire during the Hijra as early disciples from Mecca, persecuted by the ruling Quraysh tribe. They were received by the Christian ruler of Axum, whom Arabic tradition has named Ashama ibn Abjar (King Armah in Ge'Ez and Amharic), and he settled them in Negash, located in the Tigray Region. On the other hand, the principal centre of Islamic culture, learning, and propagation has been in Wollo, which is located in the Amhara Region. The Quraysh sent emissaries to bring them back to Arabia, but the king of Axum refused their demands. The Prophet himself instructed his followers who came to the Axumite Empire to respect and protect Axum as well as live in peace with the native Christians. While the city of Medina, north of Mecca, ultimately became the new home of most of the exiles from Mecca, a 7th-century cemetery excavated inside the boundaries of Negash shows the Muslim community survived their departure.

The period of Fasilides (r. 1632–1667) gave Muslims a good opportunity to expand their religion throughout the country. Emperor Yohannis (r. 1667–1682) created a council of Muslims to establish their own quarters in Addis Alem, far from the Christians in the political and commercial capital, Gondar. Muslims were able to have their own space, and the population of Muslims increased because of wider urbanisation.

Islam and Christianity have had their conflicts within the country; from the birth of Islam to the 16th century, Christians dominated the borderlands where Islam was more prominent. This brought about the settlement of Islam in Ethiopia and the Horn of Africa. In the Dahlak Islands, the first Muslims resided from the 8th century until the 10th century, when Islam spread along the Red Sea, and Islam was restricted to northern Ethiopia because Christianity was already more dominant in the rest of the country. The port of Zeila allowed Islam to enter through the eastern and central parts of Ethiopia, where Christianity had not yet reached.

During the 19th century, Emperor Tewodros II (r. 1855–1868) demanded that his Muslim subjects convert to Christianity or leave his empire. Some Muslims converted due to coercion; non-converts moved to the western parts of Gojjam, near Sudan, where they continued practising Islam. Tewodros' successor, Emperor Yohannes IV (r. 1872–1889), continued to coerce Muslims into converting to achieve religious uniformity by ordering them to be baptised within three years.

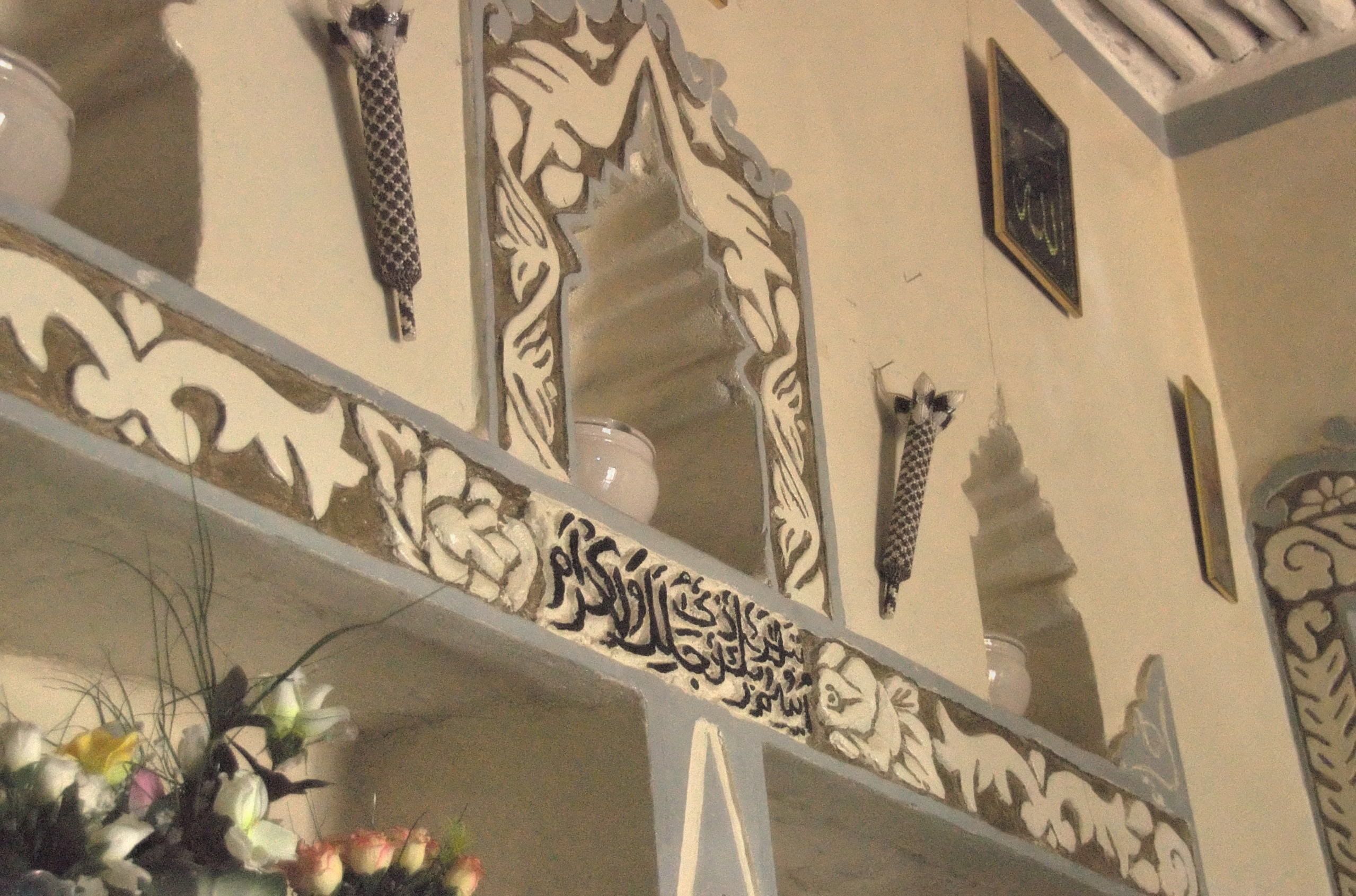
A traditional home in Harar with a niche adorned with Islamic calligraphy

Islam developed more rapidly in the eastern part of the Horn region, particularly among the Somalis and Hararis. This was challenged by the mostly Christian northern people of Abyssinia, including Amhara, Tigray and north-western Oromo. However, the north and northeastern expansion of the Oromo, who practised mainstream traditional Waaqa, affected the growth of Islam in its early days. Historian Ulrich Braukamper says that "the expansion of the non-Muslim Oromo people during subsequent centuries mostly eliminated Islam in those areas". However, following the centralisation of some Oromo communities, some of them adopted Islam and today constitute over 50% of their population.

The expansion of this region is tied to coastal ports in Somalia, such as Zeila, which operated as a center for Islam cultural exchange. This connected the Horn of Africa to Arabia which supported not only transported goods but intellectual exchange. This encouraged Islam to spread inland, creating mosques and Quranic schools, which was done by pastoralists and religious teachers, which occurred more organically through religious networks rather than state expansion.

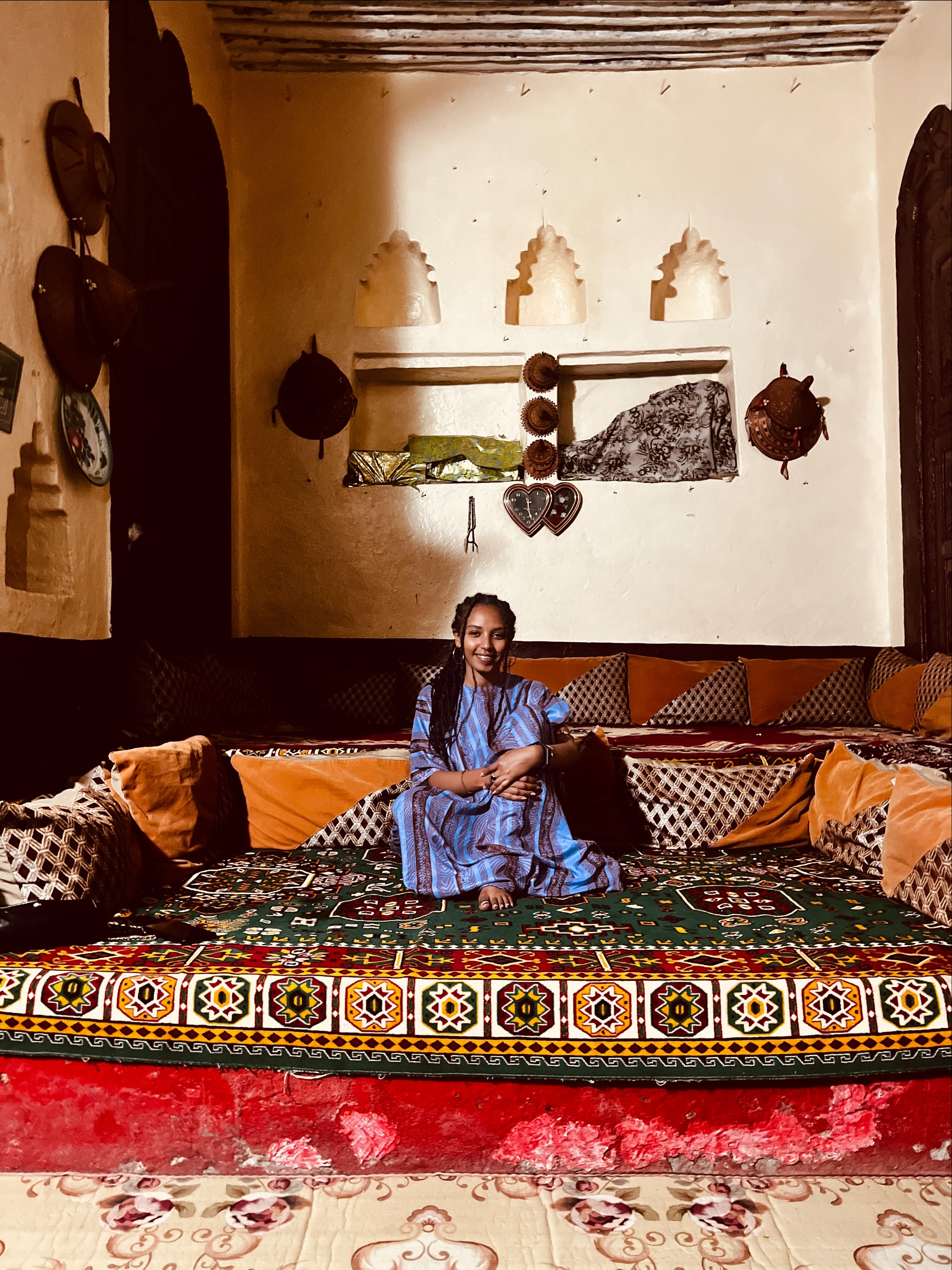
A Harari home, with a woman wearing a diriyah, clothing that is closely associated with East African Indian Ocean culture. The furniture of the home also reflects similar ground-level choices, common in Islamic culture.

With the Harari Region in particular, the city of Harar emerged as one of the most significant centers of Islamic learning in the Horn of Africa. Often referred to as the “City of Saints,” or "Africa's Mecca", Harar developed numerous mosques, shrines, and scholarly institutions that helped spread Islamic teachings across the region. The city was closely linked to other Islamic centers, therefore it was easy to facilitate theological knowledge. However, they still exhibited political autonomy, which allowed them to persist Christian kingdom pressures. The Harari people also developed distinct practices which reflects the blending of Islamic and local traditions. After finishing their Ramadan, they celebrate by chewing "khat", a leaf with stimulating drug-like properties.

In the 16th century, Muslims from the Adal Sultanate embarked on the Conquest of Abyssinia (Futuh al-Habash) under the command of Ahmad ibn Ibrahim al-Ghazi (referred to as Gragn Mohammed or "Mohammed the left-handed" in Amharic).

Muslim states, such as the Sultanate of Ifat, played an important role in institutionalizing Islam through governance, education, and regional diplomacy. This sultanate existed from the late 1200s to early 1400s and it largely controlled both inland and coastal trade routes. This was supported by the fact that there is a large population in the Somali region, which stimulated the coastal network. Ifat contributed to the rise of Harar as the center it became. It officialized Islam as a local religion, beyond traders.

Under the former Emperor Haile Selassie, Muslim communities could bring matters of personal and family law and inheritance before Islamic courts; many did so and probably continued to do so under the revolutionary regime. However, many Muslims dealt with such matters in terms of customary law. For example, the Somalis and other pastoralists tended not to follow the requirement that daughters inherit half as much property as sons, particularly when livestock were at issue. In parts of Eritrea, the tendency to treat land as the corporate property of a descent group (lineage or clan) precluded following the Islamic principle of division of property among one's heirs.

=== The First Hijrah ===
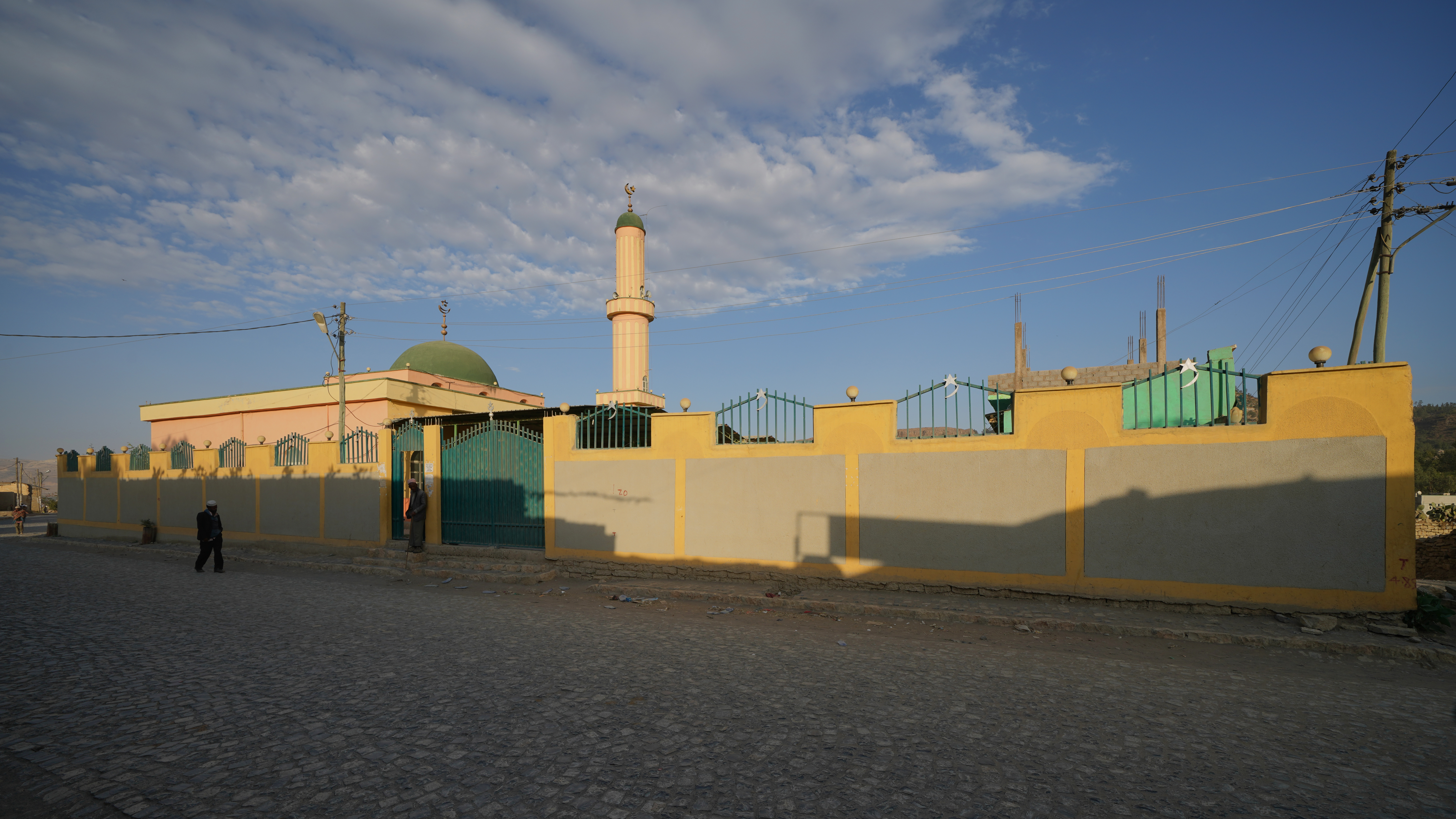
A mosque in Mekelle

When Mohammed saw the persecution to which his followers were subjected in Mecca, he told them to find safe haven in northern Ethiopia, Abyssinia, where they would "find a king there who does not wrong anyone". It was the first hijra (migration) in Islamic history.

The persecution his followers suffered was due to polytheists who harmed the weaker Muslims and blackmailed richer Muslims, causing a severe decline in business. The abuse the Muslims endured eventually led people to convert, while others held their Islamic beliefs. Abdullah ibn Masud was a new convert and participated in a Muslim group where a member suggested reciting the Qur'an in Masjid al-Haram because the people of the Quraysh had never heard it before. Abdullah agreed to do so, and the polytheists were so amazed they pounded on him until he bled to prevent the verses from affecting them.

Subsequently, because of the threats early Muslims suffered, the verses from An-Nahl were revealed. According to historians, these verses were specifically sent as instructions for the migration to Abyssinia. The threats by the polytheists were so harsh that they prompted the Prophet to save his people and have them migrate to Abyssinia to escape the harassment, making it the first migration in Islam.

=== The fourth holiest Muslim city ===
Ethiopia is home to Harar. According to UNESCO, it is regarded as the fourth-holiest city of Islam. It has 82 mosques, three of which date from the 10th century, as well as 102 shrines. The city of Harar is located in eastern Ethiopia and gained its role as an Islamic centre in the 16th century AD. Harar is contained by a jugol, a wall built of local Hashi stone bonded together by mud and wood, and it was able to protect the city from the invasion of the non-Muslim Oromo in 1567. Harar began to develop the characteristics of an Islamic city with the Shafi'i school in the 19th century as well as Harar serving as a conduit for the spreading of Islam in the Oromo population during an Islamisation campaign under the reign of Amir Muhammad.

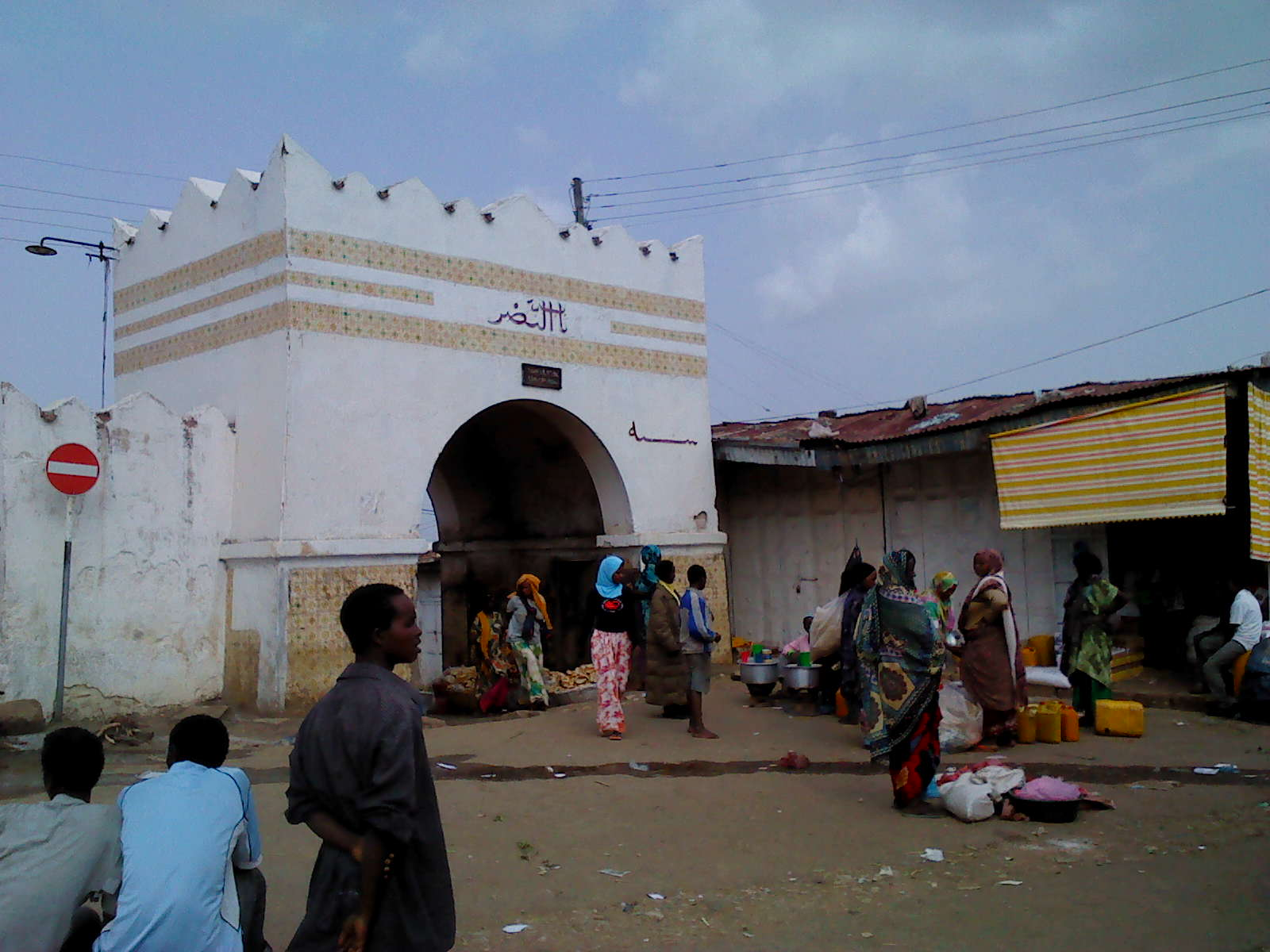
Harar, Ethiopia

The 82 mosques in Harar have served a religious and social function for society. Once a day, men go and pray in the mosque while the women pray at home, though construction has begun in areas where women can pray as well. Mosques would also allow Islamic learning, such as the interpretation of the Quran, the Arabic language, and the principles of Islam.

== Denominations ==
=== Sunni ===
Muslims in Ethiopia are predominantly Sunni. In Sunni Islam, there are four schools of thought, and three of them are located in Ethiopia; the main one is the Shafi'i school. Roughly 98% of Ethiopian Muslims are Sunni, whilst another 2% adhere to other sects.

=== Shia ===
Shia Islam is not represented in Ethiopia compared to other denominations.

=== Ibadism ===
Ibadis were allegedly seen as the most admirable Muslims to be eligible for the caliphate office and are known for being the earliest sect of Islam. There are about 500,000 Ibadis residing in North and East Africa as well as Oman and Tanzania.

=== Islamic Orthodox ===
The Orientalist notion defined Islamic Orthodoxy "as the point of departure that consequently measured other practices and beliefs as syncretistic or pre-Islamic". J. Spencer Trimingham, the author of Islam in Ethiopia, examined the impacts of Islam in the country and arranged his analysis by a hierarchical typology of different forms of appropriation categorised as an "orthodox system". Institutions of Islamic learning in Ethiopia maintained Islamic Orthodoxy within the community.

== Muslim land rights ==
Gojjam, Ethiopia

Muslims were one of the marginalised groups that were not allowed access to land until the 1974 revolution, which brought forth major changes to the socio-political and religious position of Ethiopian Muslims. In Gojjam, most Muslims did not have hereditary right over land. Instead, they could rent land or make some other agreement with the landowner. For example, Muslims could clear forest and then settle in the area after agreeing to offer some type of service to the balebat.

== Rise of Salafism and Wahhabism ==
Salafism and Wahhabism are derived from Al-Salaf, signifying a link back to what is known as pure and authentic Islam. The main aspect of Salafism is the emphasis on the idea that there is only one God. In Ethiopia, the concept of Salafism applies to the resistance of pilgrimages to local shrines, the celebration of the Prophet's birthday and other practices. Saudi Arabia is known for the rise of Salafism in Ethiopia, but the arrival of Salafism in Ethiopia is due to the Italian occupation from 1936 to 1941. Many Ethiopians were making their way to Hajj when they were subsidised by the Italians, who introduced Salafi teachings to the town of Harar before spreading them to other parts of the country.

The Wahhabism movement began to spread in the 1990s due to the political transition in 1991 and the arrival of the Ethiopian People's Revolutionary Democratic Front (EPRDF). The EPRDF promised a change within Ethiopia's religious groups through decentralising the structure of ethnic federalism to enable Salafis to raise their activities. During this period, a new generation of Salafis emerged. Salafi teachings became widespread due to organisations in Ethiopia like the World Association of Muslim Youth (WAMY), the Islamic Da'wa and Knowledge Organization, and the Awolia College. Besides the organisations, the Salafi movement was led by Oromo scholars who were developing the ideology in Ethiopia. The youth became involved in the movement and began to call people to align with the obligatory practices of Islam with strict Salafi teachings.

From January 2012 to August 2013, the city of Addis Ababa was swarmed with protests by Muslim demonstrators because of the alleged government-enforced al-Ahbash campaigns, which Muslims viewed as an interference in religious affairs by the regime. The protests sparked concern within the regime of what looked like "extremism", a concept that is accredited with the Salafi movement. Within the regime, local and international observers are claiming that Wahhabist extremists want to gain political power to turn Ethiopia into an Islamic state. Others have argued that Ethiopian Wahhabism is reluctant and opposed to getting involved in politics. Due to the expansion of the Wahhabism movement, it has brought up intense debates over religious symbols and rituals intrinsic to Ethiopian Islam.

Prior to the EPRDF, Ethiopia was ruled by the Derg Regime, a Communist government that came to power in 1974 and heavily restricted religious institutions. Its fall in 1991 was critical for the improvement of life for Ethiopian Muslims, who had faced closures of mosques, limitations on Islamic schools, and restrictions on public religious gatherings. After the Derg’s collapse, protections for religious freedom increased, allowing communities to rebuild mosques, reopen madrasas, and establish Islamic cultural institutions.

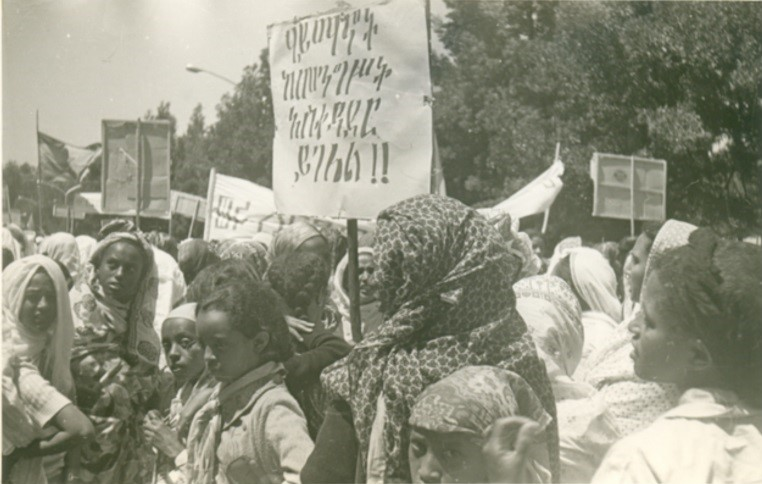
Muslim women protesting the Derg regime in 1974, upon its creation

In the Somali Region, this change led to an expansion of Islamic infrastructure and education. More mosques were constructed, and opportunities for Islamic learning grew, both in religious studies and in schools that combined secularism and piety. The greater freedom also enabled Ethiopian Muslims to connect more closely with the wider Muslim world, through pilgrimage, foreign scholarships, and access to international Islamic publications. These interactions contributed to the spread of Salafism, introducing new religious perspectives alongside existing Sufi traditions.

== Sharia courts ==
All around the world, Sharia courts are designed to question and make decisions regarding Muslim law. Sharia courts have existed in Ethiopia since the country accepted Islam and the influence of the religion in the coastal areas that are surrounding the country. The courts became officially recognised by the state in 1942 when the Proclamation for the Establishment of Khadis Courts was issued. The Proclamation defined the authority of the courts but was repealed in 1994 by the Khadis and Naiba Councils Proclamation, providing a three-tier set of courts: the Supreme Court of Sharia, the High Court of Sharia, and the First Instance Court of Sharia, each with its own judges and a necessary number of Khadis. The Khadis and Naiba councils decide on any questions surrounding marriage, such as divorce and guardianship of children; all that must be related to Mohammedan law or all the parties must be Muslim. Also, the councils decide on any questions about wills or succession, given that the donor or deceased was a Muslim. Lastly, the courts decide on any questions regarding payments of the costs incurred by the aforementioned decisions. The provisions provided by the courts made the Ethiopian Muslim courts similar to those in Sudan, Nigeria and other African countries where Sharia courts exist to handle the personal laws of the Muslim population.

Sharia law has a different approach to tackling gender equality. Islamic law contains different ways to treat women that can be applied in courts, for example, divorce, partition of property, inheritance and many more. Final decisions made by the Sharia court are treated as an exception to the constitutional standard of Article 9(1), which states, "The Constitution is the supreme law of the land. All laws, customary practices, and decisions made by state organs or public officials inconsistent therewith, shall be null and void." It raises a question about Ethiopia's commitment to human rights because personal status laws, which are under Ethiopia's jurisdiction of sharia courts, are considered an area of law in which discrimination on the basis of gender is established.

== Muslims in contemporary Ethiopia ==
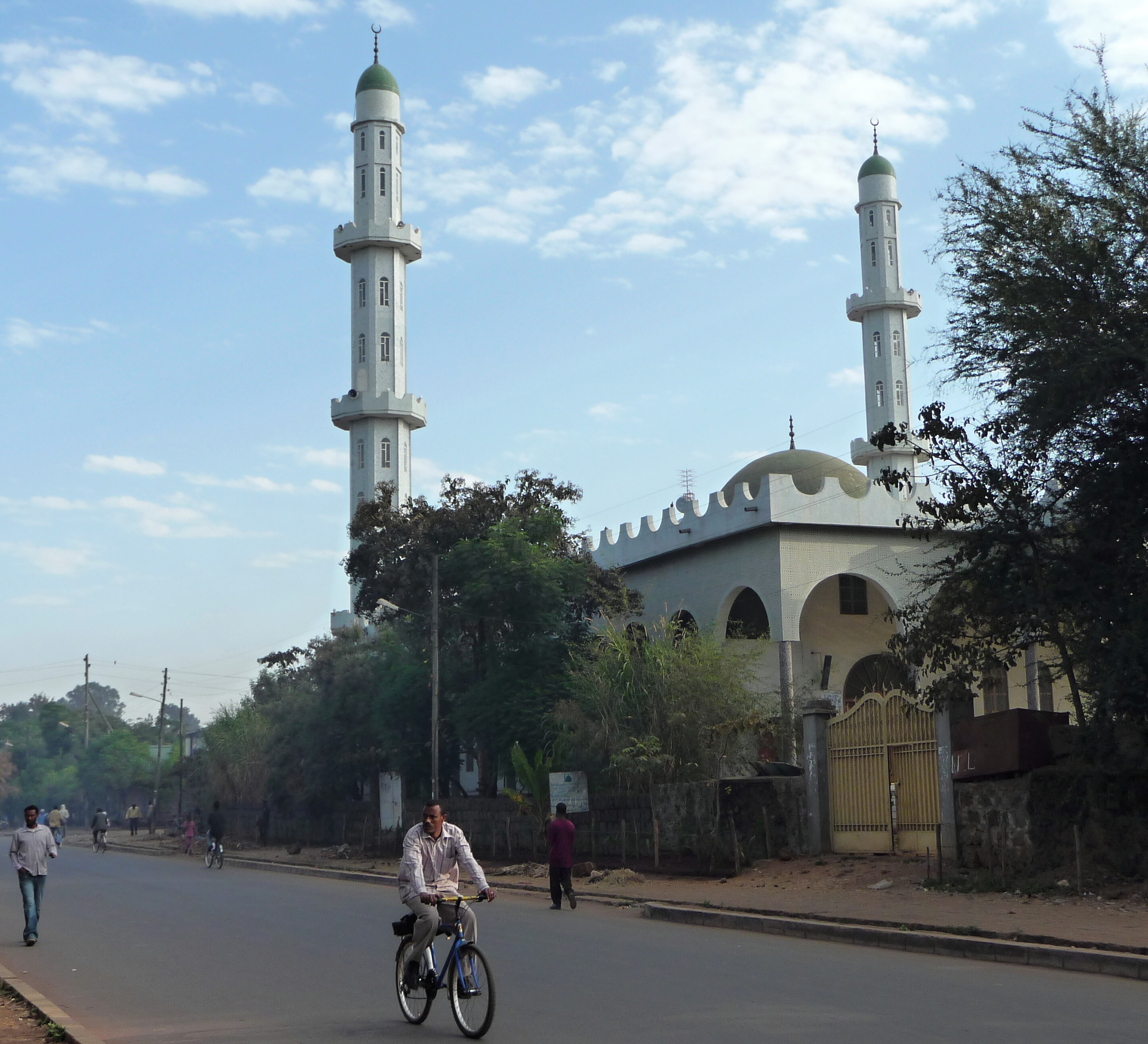
A mosque in Bahir Dar

Much like the rest of the Muslim world, the beliefs and practices of the Muslims in Ethiopia are essentially the same: embodied in the Qur'an and the Sunnah. There are also Sufi brotherhoods present in Ethiopia, such as the Qadiriyya order in Wello. The most important Islamic religious practices, such as the daily ritual prayers (Salat) and fasting (Arabic: صوم, romanized: Sawm; Ethiopic: ጾም, S.om or Tsom) during the holy month of Ramadan, are observed both in urban centres and in rural areas, among both settled peoples and nomads. Numerous Muslims in Ethiopia perform the pilgrimage to Mecca every year.

In Ethiopia's Muslim communities, as in neighbouring Sudan and Somalia, many of the faithful are associated with, but not necessarily members of, any specific Sufi order. Nevertheless, formal and informal attachment to Sufi practices is widespread. The emphasis seems less on the contemplative and disciplined mysticism and more on the concentration of the spiritual powers possessed by certain founders of the orders and the leaders of local branches.

In contemporary Ethiopia, Islamic communities navigate issues of religious identity, education, and political representation. Debates surrounding reform movements have influenced discourse within Ethiopia’s broader society. For example, the growth of Salafi movements has contributed to debates, particularly between Salafi reformers and followers of longstanding Sufi traditions. Historically, Ethiopian Islam has been highly influenced by Sufism, as well as it being incorporated in religions practices like shrine visitation. Salafis criticized these because it emphasized "innovations", as opposed to original Islam.

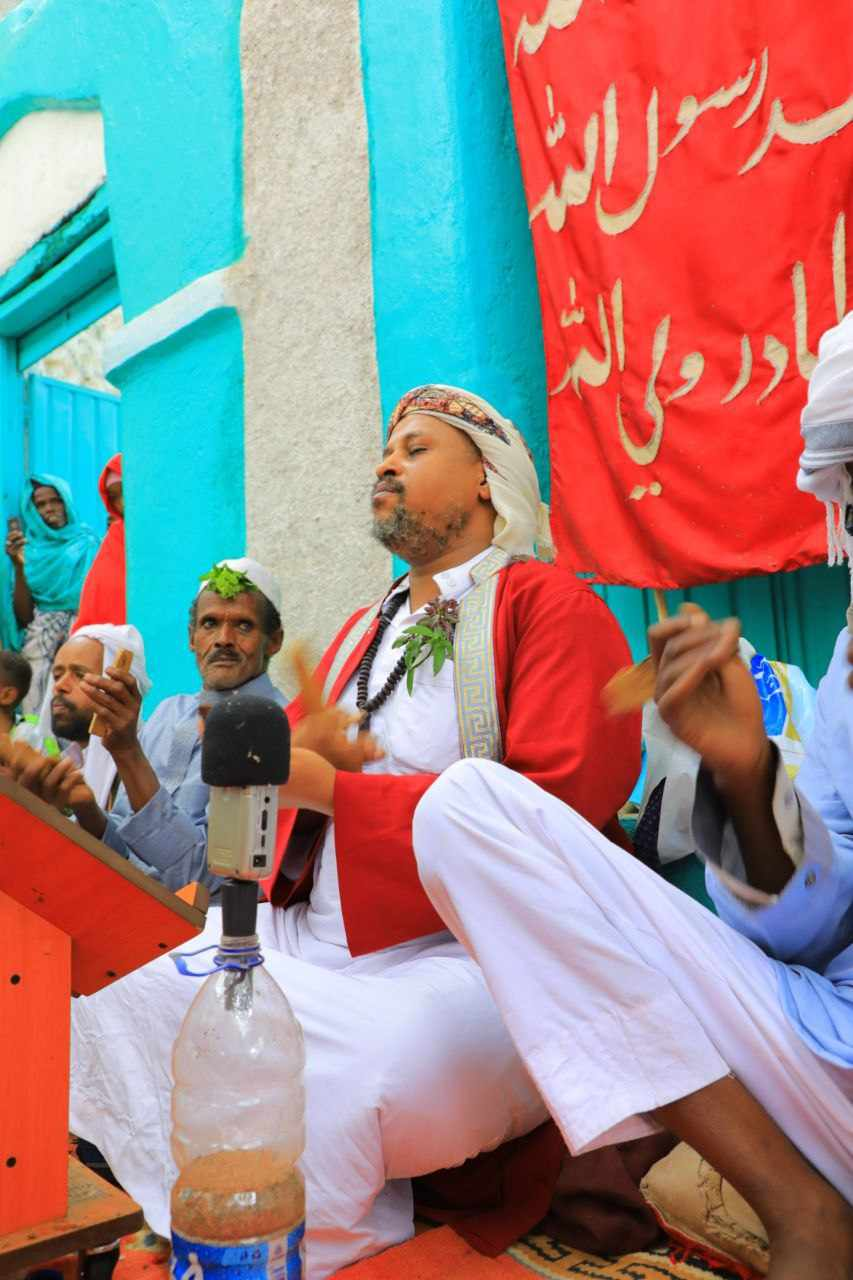
Ethiopian Sufi Muslims celebrating the first Victory of Islam

Protesting is still not lost to the Ethiopian Muslim community. In the early 2010s, they organized a movement due to their perceived government interference in their religion. They criticized the emphasis of religious education, which was promoted through the al-Ahbash movement. This is a Sunni ideology, with slight Sufi influence, deriving its name for the Arabic word for Abyssinians. This was created in Lebanon, in the 1980s, by an Ethiopian scholar named Abdullah al-Harari. He heavily rejected the Salafi and Wahhabi interpretations of Islam, and instead encouraged a strict return to early Islamic practices. This was controversial because Ethiopian Muslims demanded religious independence and an end of government involvement in Islamic education.

Muslims in contemporary Ethiopia have become actively engaged in challenging their political marginalisation through the Ethiopian People's Revolutionary Democratic Front. They are persistent in wanting to engage with the EPRDF's basis of political legitimacy and challenging their forceful secularism that limits religion to the private domain. In the context of electoral politics, Muslims have become increasingly involved in voting blocs. Their demands include expanding into Western financial institutions, consolidation with other parts of the Islamic world and the right to religious expression freely.

== See also ==
- Religion in Ethiopia
- Islam by country
- Abadir Umar Ar-Rida
- List of non-Arab Sahaba
