= Ethiopia–Saudi Arabia relations =

Ethiopia-Saudi relations

- Ethiopia: Saudi Arabia

Diplomatic mission
- Embassy of Ethiopia, Riyadh, Saudi Arabia: Embassy of Saudi Arabia, Addis Ababa, Ethiopia

Envoy
- Ethiopian ambassador to Saudi Arabia Mr. Lencho Bati: Saudi Ambassador to Ethiopia Dr. Fahad Alhumaydani Almotairi

Ethiopia–Saudi Arabia relations (Amharic: ኢትዮጵያ-ሳውዲ አረብ ቤቶች; Arabic: العلاقات الإثيوبية السعودية) are the bilateral relations between the Federal Democratic Republic of Ethiopia and the Kingdom of Saudi Arabia. These relations are often referred to as Ethiopian-Saudi relations or Ethio-Saudi relations and encompass various aspects of diplomatic, economic, and cultural exchanges between the two nations. Ethiopia and Saudi Arabia established diplomatic relations in 1949. The historical roots of their interactions can be traced back to 7th century when early Muslims faced persecution in Mecca, some of them had sought refuge in the Christian Kingdom of Axum (present day Ethiopia) whose ruler at that time was Najashi.

== Trade ==
The trade relations between Ethiopia and Saudi Arabia was inactive even after the establishment of diplomatic relations. However, 1991 was the turning point in the relations between the two countries. After Ethiopian Civil War ended, economic interactions took more importance though political and religious contacts still had significance. Saudi Arabia became one of the main suppliers of fuel to Ethiopia for many years until Kuwait and UAE took over.

== Cultural relations ==
Cultural relations between Ethiopia and Saudi Arabia have been fostered through various initiatives and events, serving to strengthen the bond between these two nations. Notable among these is the Ethiopian Community Hall in Jeddah, which has played a central role in promoting Ethiopian culture and heritage within the Kingdom of Saudi Arabia. On 1 January every year a cultural event takes place in Jeddah organized by the Ethiopian consulate in Jeddah, which exemplifies the richness of Ethiopian-Saudi relations. In 2016, More than 1000 Ethiopians residing in Jeddah, representing diverse ethno-linguistic groups from their homeland, had gathered to celebrate their cultural heritage. On this day Ethiopians generally get dressed in vibrant traditional outfits and come together to attend the event. This type of events serve as a platform for cultural exchange, allowing Ethiopians to showcase their traditions, music, dance and cuisine, while also providing an opportunity for Saudis and others to immerse themselves in Ethiopian culture.

== Ethiopian migrants in Saudi Arabia ==
Ethiopian migrants have been fleeing their country due to severe human rights abuses, particularly during the recent conflict in northern Ethiopia. Many have undertaken a perilous journey known as the "Eastern Route" or "Yemeni Route." This route involves crossing the Gulf of Aden, passing through Yemen, and ultimately seeking refuge in Saudi Arabia.

== Ethiopian Embassy in Saudi Arabia ==
The Ethiopian Embassy in Saudi Arabia is located in Riyadh.

- The ambassador of Ethiopia to Saudi Arabia is Dr. Mukatar kedire i.

== Saudi Arabian Embassy in Ethiopia ==
The Saudi Arabian Embassy in Ethiopia is located in Addis Ababa.

- The ambassador of Saudi Arabia to Ethiopia is Dr. Fahad Alhumaydani.
