= Negash =

Village in Tigray, Ethiopia

- Village
- Location in Ethiopia
- Coordinates: 13°52′53″N 39°35′56″E
- Country: Ethiopia
- Region: Tigray
- Zone: Misraqawi (Eastern)
- Woreda: Wukro

Population (2007)
  - Total: 7,753
- Time zone: EAT

Negash is a village in the Tigray Region of Ethiopia, which straddles the Adigrat to Mekelle road 10 kilometres (6.2 miles) north of Wukro. It is located in Wukro woreda.

== History ==
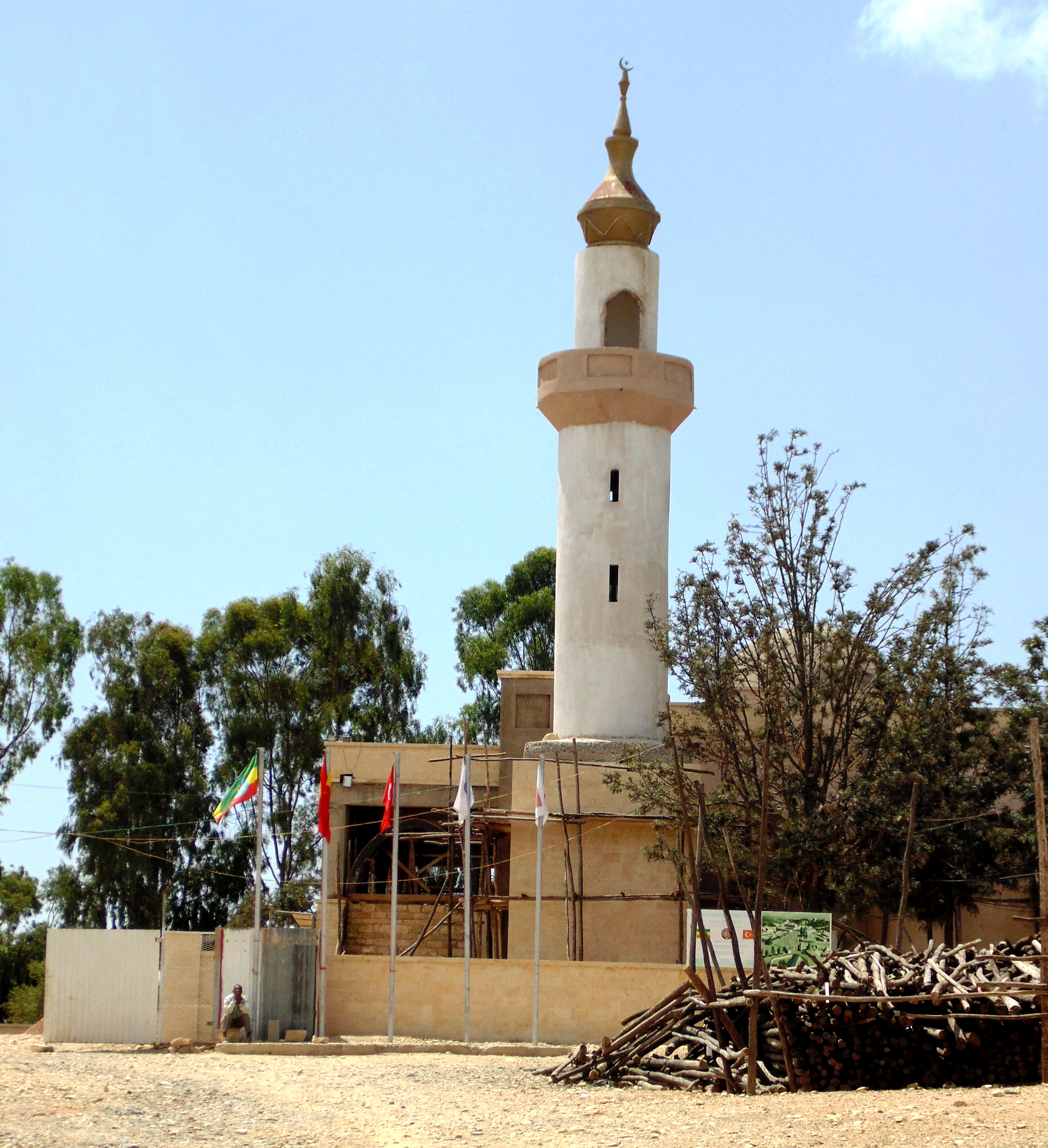
Amedin Mosque

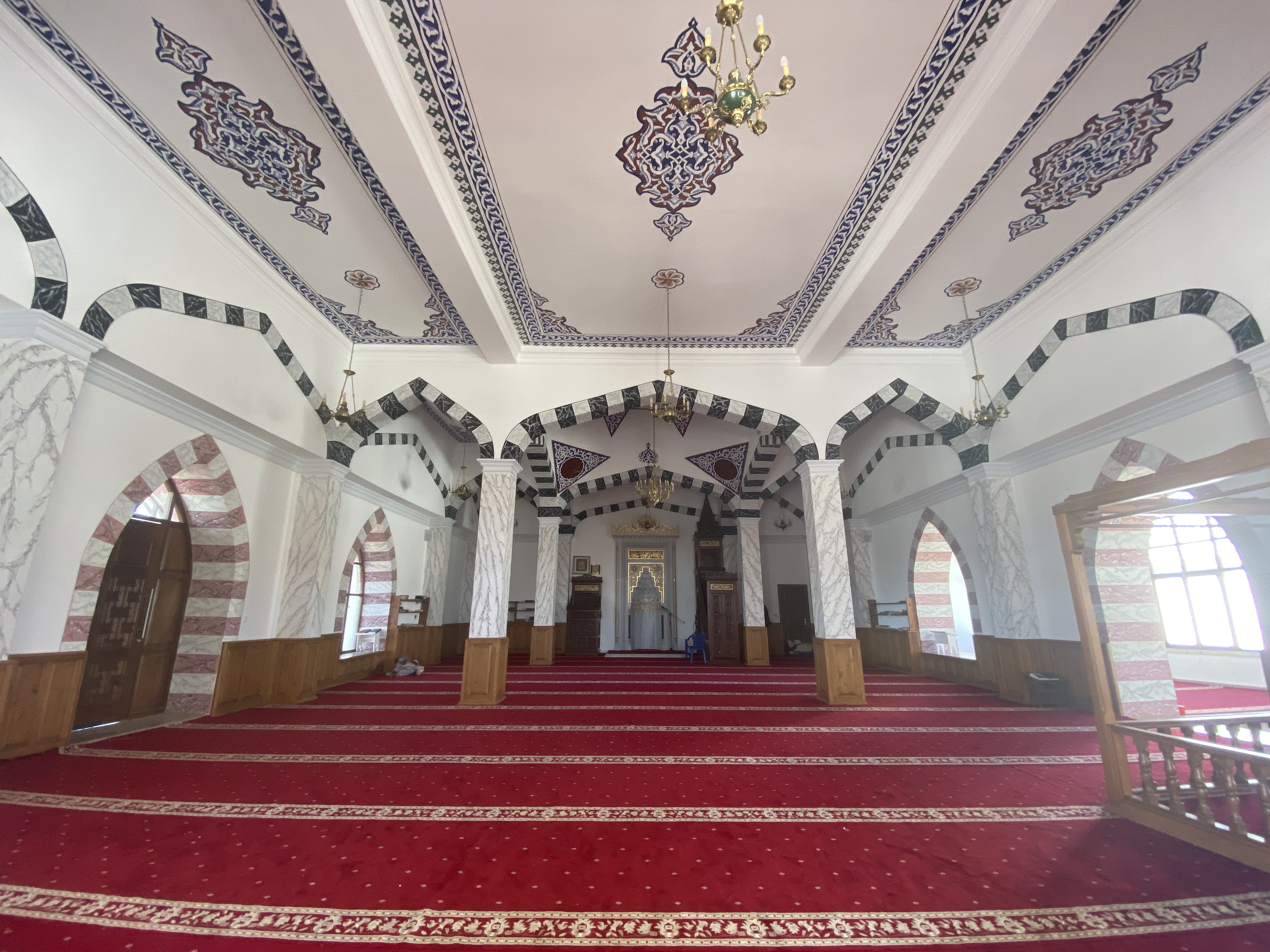
Interior of the new Negash mosque, completed in 2019

Negash is considered to be the earliest Muslim settlement in Africa. The Futuh al-Habasha records Ahmad ibn Ibrahim al-Ghazi visited the tomb of Ashama ibn Abjar in Negash during his invasion of the province of Tigray (around 1537). Negash is also known for having one of Africa's oldest mosques, that is the Al Nejashi Mosque.

In 2020 during Tigray War, the Al Nejashi Mosque was heavily damaged from shelling and looting.

== Demographics ==
In the statistical tables of the 2007 census published by the Central Statistical Agency, the kebele Negash is located in is reported to have a total population of 7,753 of whom 3,607 are men and 4,146 women; they are distributed amongst 1,689 households in 1,626 housing units. Although it is known for its particular relationship with Islam, 98.2% of the population follows the Ethiopian Orthodox Tewahedo Church, the 1.1% of the population is Protestant, and the remaining 0.7% is Muslim.

== Climate ==
Negash, located in the Tigray region of Ethiopia, experiences a semi-arid climate with distinct wet and dry seasons. The rainy season spans from June to September, with July and August receiving the heaviest rainfall. Temperatures in Negash are generally warm throughout the year, with cooler nights and occasional variability depending on elevation and rainfall. The dry season, from October to May, sees minimal precipitation, and the landscape remains arid.

Climate data for Negash (1991 - 2021 averages)
Month	Jan	Feb	Mar	Apr	May	Jun	Jul	Aug	Sep	Oct	Nov	Dec	Year
Mean daily maximum °C (°F)	20.2 (68.4)	21.4 (70.5)	22.4 (72.3)	23.0 (73.4)	24.2 (75.6)	24.4 (75.9)	21.4 (70.5)	21.4 (70.5)	22.4 (72.3)	21.4 (70.5)	20.3 (68.5)	19.7 (67.5)	21.9 (71.3)
Daily mean °C (°F)	14.2 (57.6)	15.3 (59.5)	16.5 (61.7)	17.5 (63.5)	18.7 (65.7)	18.4 (65.1)	16.5 (61.7)	16.6 (61.9)	17.1 (62.8)	16.0 (60.8)	14.6 (58.3)	13.7 (56.7)	16.3 (61.3)
Mean daily minimum °C (°F)	9.7 (49.5)	10.4 (50.7)	11.8 (53.2)	12.9 (55.2)	13.8 (56.8)	13.3 (55.9)	13.0 (55.4)	13.3 (55.9)	12.4 (54.3)	11.3 (52.3)	10.0 (50.0)	9.1 (48.4)	11.8 (53.1)
Average relative humidity (%) (daily average)	64	56	55	57	51	55	83	82	64	57	59	60	62
Mean daily sunshine hours	9.0	9.7	10.0	10.3	10.9	10.2	6.7	6.2	9.6	9.8	9.3	9.2	9.2
Source: climate-data.org

== See also ==
- Islam in Africa
- Migration to Abyssinia
- Second migration to Abyssinia
- Northeast Africa
