= Shahab Ahmed =

Pakistani scholar of Islam (1966–2015)

- شہاب احمد
- Born: December 11, 1966; Singapore
- Died: September 17, 2015 (aged 48)

Academic background
- Education: International Islamic University Malaysia (BA); American University in Cairo (MA); Princeton University (PhD)

Academic work
- Discipline: Islamic studies
- Institutions: Princeton University (2004–05); Harvard University (2005–15)
- Notable works: What is Islam? The Importance of Being Islamic

Shahab Ahmed (Urdu: شہاب احمد; December 11, 1966 – September 17, 2015) was a Pakistani scholar of Islam at Harvard University.

Ahmed's posthumous work What Is Islam? was listed in The Chronicle of Higher Education as one of the eleven best scholarly books of the 2010s, chosen by Noah Feldman. Professor Elias Muhanna of Brown University described the work as "a strange and brilliant work, encyclopedic in vision and tautly argued in the manner of logical proof, yet pervaded by the urgency of a political manifesto".

== Life ==
Ahmed's parents were Pakistani doctors who were living in Singapore at the time of his birth. He was born at Mount Alvernia Hospital, educated at Anglo Chinese School, Singapore and Caterham School, before studying at International Islamic University Malaysia. After work as a journalist in Afghanistan, he gained a master's degree at the American University in Cairo and his PhD at Princeton University. He was a junior member of the Harvard Society of Fellows (2000–2003), and served as a Visiting Lecturer and Research Fellow at Princeton University (2004–2005), Associate Professor of Islamic Studies at Harvard University (2005–2014), Higher Education Commission of Pakistan Visiting Scholar at the Islamic Research Institute in Islamabad (2007–2008), and Lecturer on Law and Research Fellow in Islamic Legal Studies at Harvard Law School (2014–2015).

A polyglot who was "master of perhaps 15 languages", Ahmed's broad field of study was Islamic intellectual history, with a special interest in the Satanic Verses and the supposed evaluation of its historicity by Islamic scholars of the medieval period.

He died of leukemia on 17 September 2015, at the age of 48.

In a posthumous presentation about him, Shahab Ahmed's sister highlighted her brother's fondness and appreciation for good wine. In this regard, she noted that "he felt very much in good company with Jahangir, with Ghalib, and with other writers [...] he adored."

== Publications ==
=== Books ===
- Ibn Taymiyya and his Times. Co-edited with Yossef Rapoport. Oxford University Press: 1st Edition: September 9, 2015, 400 p. (ISBN 019940206X).
- What is Islam? The Importance of Being Islamic. Princeton University Press: November 17, 2015, 624 p. (ISBN 0691164185).
- Before orthodoxy: the Satanic Verses in early Islam. Harvard University Press: April 24, 2017, 336 p. (ISBN 9780674047426).
- Neither Paradise Nor Hellfire: Understanding Islam through the Ottomans, Understanding the Ottomans through Islam (forthcoming as of 2025).

=== Articles ===
- "Ibn Taymiyyah and the Satanic Verses". Studia Islamica 87 (1998): 67–124.
- "The Poetics of Solidarity: Palestine in Modern Urdu Poetry", Alif: Journal of Comparative Poetics/Alif: Majallat al-Balāghah al-Muqāranah 18 (1998), thematic issue on "Post-colonial Discourse in South Asia/Khiṭāb mā ba`d al-kūlūniyāliyyah fī junūb āsyā," 29-64.
- "Mapping the World of a Scholar in sixth/twelfth century Bukhara: Regional Tradition in Medieval Islamic Scholarship as Reflected in a Bibliography", Journal of the American Oriental Society, 120.1 (2000), 24-43.
- "The Sultan's Syllabus: A Curriculum for the Ottoman Imperial Medreses Prescribed in a Fermān of Qānūnī I Süleymān, Dated 973 (1565)", cowritten with Nenad Filipovic. Studia Islamica 98/99 (2004): 183–218.
