= Migration to Abyssinia =

Episode in the early history of Islam

- Part of the diplomatic career of Muhammad
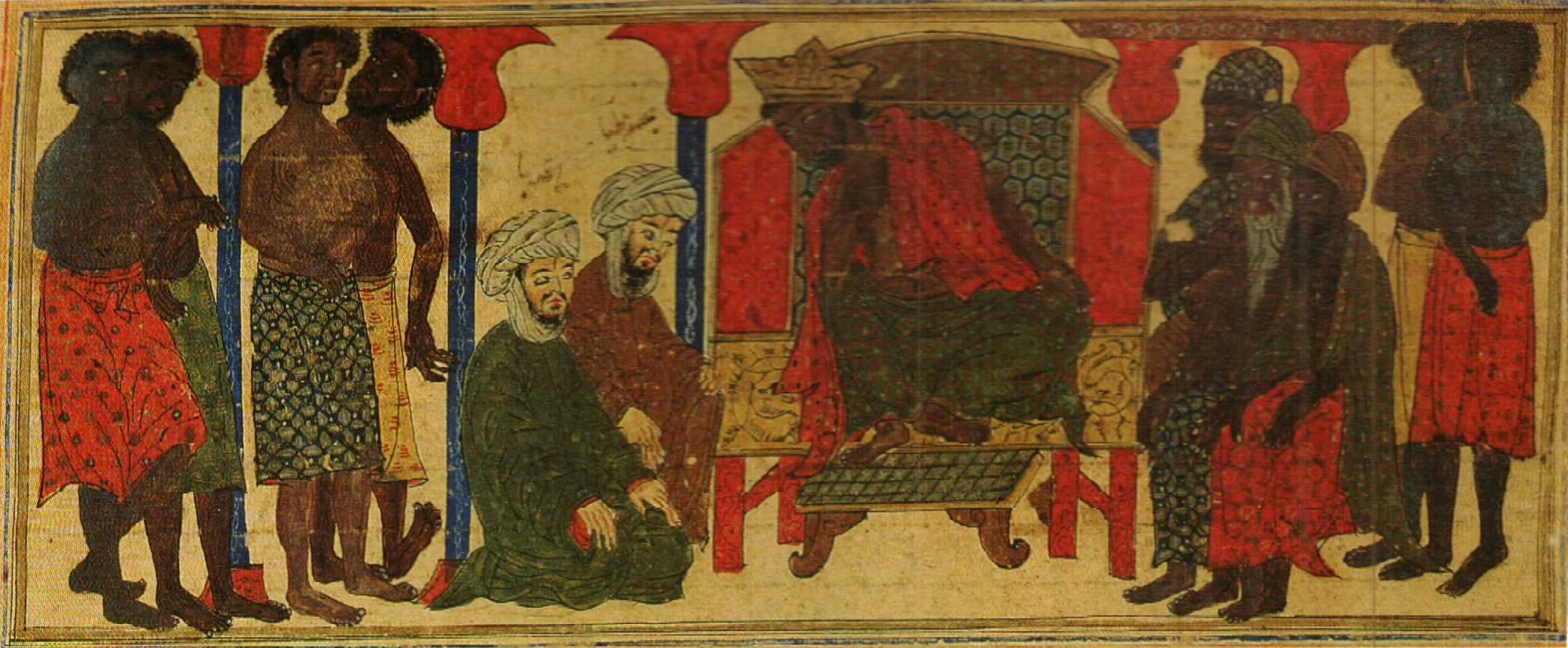
- 1314 manuscript illustration by Rashid ad-Din depicting the Negus of medieval Abyssinia declining a Meccan delegation's request to surrender the early Muslims.
- Native name: الهجرة إلى الحبشة
- Date: c. 613-615 CE (9-7 BH)
- Also known as: Hijrah Habashah ʽUla (الهجرة الأولى إلى الحبشة) or Hijrah il-al-Habashah (الهجرة إلى الحبشة)
- Motive: To escape persecution by the Quraysh
- Participants: The early Sahabah: Eleven men and four women
- Outcome: Some of the early Muslims settle in Aksum
- Departure location: Mecca, Hejaz, Arabia
- Destination: Aksum, Kingdom of Aksum

The migration to Abyssinia (Arabic: الهجرة إلى الحبشة, romanized: al-hijra ʾilā al-habaša), also known as the First Hijra (الهجرة الأولى, al-hijrat al'uwlaa), was an episode in the early history of Islam, where the first followers of the Islamic prophet Muhammad (they were known as the Sahabah, or the companions) migrated from Arabia due to their persecution by the Quraysh, the ruling Arab tribal confederation of Mecca. They sought and were granted refuge in the Kingdom of Aksum, an ancient Christian state that was situated in modern-day northern Ethiopia and Eritrea (also referred to as Abyssinia), in 9 BH (613 CE) or 7 BH (615 CE). The kingdom's capital was Aksum, which is an ancient city in the Tigray Region of Ethiopia. The ruling Aksumite monarch who received them is known in Islamic sources as Najashi (نجاشي, najāšī), the Negus of the kingdom; modern historians have alternatively identified him with the Aksumite king Armah and Ella Tsaham. Some of the Sahabah exiles returned to Mecca and made the migration to Medina with Muhammad, while the others remained in Aksum and arrived in Medina in 628.

The migration to Abyssinia is an Islamic historical event that refers to the migration of some of the early Muslims from Mecca to Abyssinia (the Kingdom of Aksum) because of the harm they were facing from the leaders of Quraysh. A number of Muslims left, and the first migration to Abyssinia was in Rajab of the fifth year after the mission. They were eleven men and four women, and they appointed Uthman ibn Mazun as their leader. Then, while they were in Abyssinia, they heard that the people of Mecca had converted to Islam. Some of them returned to Mecca, but they did not find that to be true. So they returned, and another group went with them to Abyssinia. It was the second migration. They were eighty-three men, their wives, and their children, headed by Ja`far ibn Abi Talib.

== Background ==
Map of the Hejaz (western Arabia) c. 613–622 CE. showing the migration paths

According to the traditional view, members of the early Muslim community in Mecca faced persecution, which prompted Muhammad to advise them to seek refuge in Aksum. The earliest extant account is given in the sirah of the eighth-century Muslim historian Ibn Ishaq:

When the apostle saw the affliction of his companions, [...] he said to them: "If you were to go to Abyssinia (it would be better for you), for the king will not tolerate injustice and it is a friendly country, until such time as Allah shall relieve you from your distress." Thereupon his companions went to Abyssinia, being afraid of apostasy and fleeing to God with their religion. This was the first hijra in Islam.

Another view, grounded in the political developments of the time, suggests that following the capture of Jerusalem in 614 by the Sasanian Empire, many believers saw a potential danger to the community as they were not the partisans of the Persians who practiced Zoroastrianism and had earlier supported the Jews of Arabia in Himyar. The acceptance of these Muslims into the Kingdom of Aksum at precisely a moment of Persian triumph in the Levant recalls the Aksumite foreign policy of the previous century, which saw Aksum and Persia compete for influence in Arabia.

== The migration(s) ==
According to historians of Islam, there were two migrations, although there are differences of opinion with regard to the dates.

The first group of migrants, which comprised twelve men and four women, who fled Arabia in the year 7 BH (615 CE) or 9 BH (613 CE) according to other sources, and was granted asylum by Najashi, the Negus of the Kingdom of Aksum, a Christian state that existed in modern-day Ethiopia and Eritrea. This group included Muhammad's daughter Ruqayyah and his son-in-law Uthman ibn Affan, who would later become the third caliph of the Rashidun Caliphate after Muhammad's death. Prior to the exile, Muhammad chose Uthman ibn Mazʽun, one of his most important companions, as the leader of this group. According to Tabqat Ibn Saʽd, the group boarded a merchant ship from the sea port of Shuʽaiba and paid a half-dinar each to cross into East Africa via the Red Sea. After a year, the exiles heard rumours that the Quraysh had converted to Islam, which prompted them to return to Mecca. Confronted with the opposite reality, they set out for the Aksumite kingdom again in 6 BH (616 CE) or 7 BH (615 CE) according to other sources, this time accompanied by other newly-founded Muslims, with the migrant group comprising 83 men and 18 women in total.

Some Western historians such as Leone Caetani (1869–1935) and William Montgomery Watt (1909–2006) questioned the account of two migrations. Although Ibn Ishaq provided two partially overlapping lists of migrants, he did not mention that the first group returned and went back a second time. Watt argued that the word used by Ibn Ishaq (tatāba‘a, transl. 'followed one after another') and the order of the names on the lists suggests that the migration may have taken place in a number of smaller groups rather than two large parties, while the appearance of the two lists reflected the controversies surrounding the assignment of priority on official registers during the reign of the second Rashidun caliph, Umar ibn al-Khattab.

== In Aksum ==
Much of the coverage of this event comes from the historian Ibn Ishaq.

When the Quraysh learned that the early Muslims were planning to move to the Aksumite kingdom, they sent a delegation to the Negus to demand the surrender of the fugitives. They selected two envoys: ‘Amr ibn al-‘As and Abdullah bin Rabiah. The Meccan envoys were given gifts for the Aksumite king Najashi and his generals. The gifts were made up of leather and prepared by fine skin. The Meccans appealed to the generals, arguing that the Muslim migrants were rebels who had invented a new religion, the likes of which neither the Meccans nor the Aksumites had heard of, and that their relatives were asking for their return. The king granted them an audience, but ultimately refused to hand over the migrants until he heard their defence.

The Sahaba were later brought in front of the Negus and his bishops. Jaʽfar ibn Abi Talib, who acted as the leader of the exiles, spoke in their defence:

O king, we were a wicked and ignorant people who worshipped idols and ate corpses. We committed all types of disgraceful acts and did not pay our due obligations to neighbours and relatives. The strong man of us suppressed the weak by power. Then Allah raised a prophet among us whose nobility, righteousness, good character and pure life were well known to us. He called us to worship only one God, and exerted us to give up idolatry and stone worship. He taught us to speak the truth, to fulfill the promise, to regard the rights of relatives and neighbours. He forbade us from indecency; asked us to offer prayer and pay Zakat; to shun everything foul and to avoid bloodshed. He forbade adultery, lewdness, telling lies, misappropriating the orphan’s heritage, bringing false accusation against others and all other indecent things to that sort. He taught us the Holy Quran, the divine revelation. When we believed in him and acted upon his nice teachings, our people began to persecute us and to subject us to torture. When their cruelties exceeded all bounds, we took shelter in your country by the permission of our prophet.

— Jaʽfar ibn Abi Talib, in the prophetic biography by Ibn Hisham

The Christian king requested their revelations from God. Jaʽfar then recited a passage from the Quran's Surah Maryam (lit. 'Chapter of Mary'). When the king heard it, he wept and exclaimed: "Verily, this is the word of Jesus (the Injeel) has come from the same source of light (miškāt)".

However, one of the envoys, ‘Amr ibn al-‘As, thought of an alternative tactic. On the following day, he returned to the king and told him that the Muslims had disrespected Jesus. When the Muslims heard that the king had summoned them again to question them about their view of Jesus, they tried to find a diplomatic answer, but ultimately decided to speak according to the revelation they had received. When the king addressed Jaʽfar, he replied that they held Jesus to be "the servant of Allah, His prophet, His spirit and His word, which he cast unto the pure virgin Mary". Muslim accounts state that upon hearing these words, the Negus declared that Jesus was indeed no more than what he had said; he turned to the Muslims and told them: "go, for you are safe in my country". He then returned the gifts to the envoys and dismissed them.

== The Satanic Verses ==
Along with many others, Tabari recorded that Muhammad was desperate, hoping for an accommodation with his tribe. So, while he was in the presence of a number of Quraysh, after delivering verses mentioning three of their favorite deities (Quran 53:19–20), Satan put upon his tongue two short verses: "These are the high flying ones / whose intercession is to be hoped for." This led to a general reconciliation between Muhammad and the Meccans, and the Muslims in Abyssinia began to return home. However, the next day, Muhammad retracted these verses at the behest of Gabriel, claiming that they had been cast by Satan to his tongue and God had abrogated them. Instead, verses that revile those goddesses were then revealed. (Note: The aforementioned Islamic histories recount that as Muhammad was reciting Sūra Al-Najm (Q.53), as revealed to him by the archangel Gabriel, Satan tempted him to utter the following lines after verses 19 and 20: "Have you thought of Allāt and al-'Uzzā and Manāt the third, the other; These are the exalted Gharaniq, whose intercession is hoped for." (Allāt, al-'Uzzā and Manāt were three goddesses worshiped by the Meccans). cf Ibn Ishaq, A. Guillaume p. 166.) (Note: "Apart from this one-day lapse, which was excised from the text, the Quran is simply unrelenting, unaccommodating and outright despising of paganism." (The Cambridge Companion to Muhammad, Jonathan E. Brockopp, p. 35).) The returning Muslims thus had to make arrangements for clan protection before they could re-enter Mecca.

According to the scholar Shahab Ahmed, the so-called Satanic Verses incident was reported en masse and documented by nearly all of the major biographers of Muhammad during Islam's first two centuries, which, according to these early sources, corresponds to Quran 22:52. Ahmed notes that with the rise of the hadith movement and systematic theology introducing new doctrines such as Ismah—the belief in Muhammad’s infallibility, which holds that he could not be deceived by Satan—the early community’s historical memory of the incident was reevaluated. By the 20th century, Muslim scholars unanimously rejected this incident. On the other hand, most European biographers of Muhammad have historically recognized the veracity of this incident of satanic verses on the basis of the criterion of embarrassment. Historian Alfred T. Welch proposes that the period of Muhammad's turning away from strict monotheism was likely far longer but was later encapsulated in a story that made it much shorter and implicated Satan as the culprit. However, recent Western secular scholarship has generally questioned the veracity of the Satanic Verses narrative.

== End of the Muslim exile ==
Many of the exiles in Aksum returned to Mecca in 622 and made the hijra to Medina with Muhammad, while a second wave went to Medina in 628.

== First migration list ==
The first list of emigrants reported by Ibn Ishaq included the following eleven men and four women:

- Sa'd ibn Abi Waqqas
- Jahsh ibn Riyab
- Abd-Allah ibn Jahsh
- Ja'far ibn Abi Talib spokesman
- Uthman, son-in-law and companion of Muhammad, husband of Ruqayyah, and the third rightly guided caliph.
- Ruqayyah bint Muhammad, the wife of Uthman and daughter of Muhammad.
- Abu Hudhayfa ibn 'Utba
- Sahla bint Suhail, wife of Abu Hudhayfa
- Zubayr ibn al-Awwam
- Mus'ab ibn Umair
- Abdur Rahman bin Awf
- Abu Salama Abd Allah ibn Abd al-Asad
- Umm Salama, wife of Abu Salama
- Uthman bin Maz'oon leader of group
- Amir bin Rabiah
- Layla bint Abi Asmah – wife of Amir

== See also ==
- Diplomatic career of Muhammad
- Mosque of the Companions in Massawa, Eritrea
- Negash
- Second migration to Abyssinia
- Timeline of 7th-century Muslim history

== Sources ==
- Ahmed, Shahab (2017). Before Orthodoxy: The Satanic Verses in Early Islam. Harvard University Press. ISBN 978-0-674-04742-6.
- Al-Tabari, Muhammad ibn Jarir (1987). The History of al-Tabari. Vol. 6: Muhammad at Mecca. State University of New York Press. ISBN 978-0-88706-707-5.
- Buhl, F.; Welch, A. T. (1993). "Muḥammad". Encyclopaedia of Islam. Vol. 7 (2nd ed.). Brill. pp. 360–376. ISBN 978-90-04-09419-2.
