= Najashi =

King of Aksum from 614 to 630

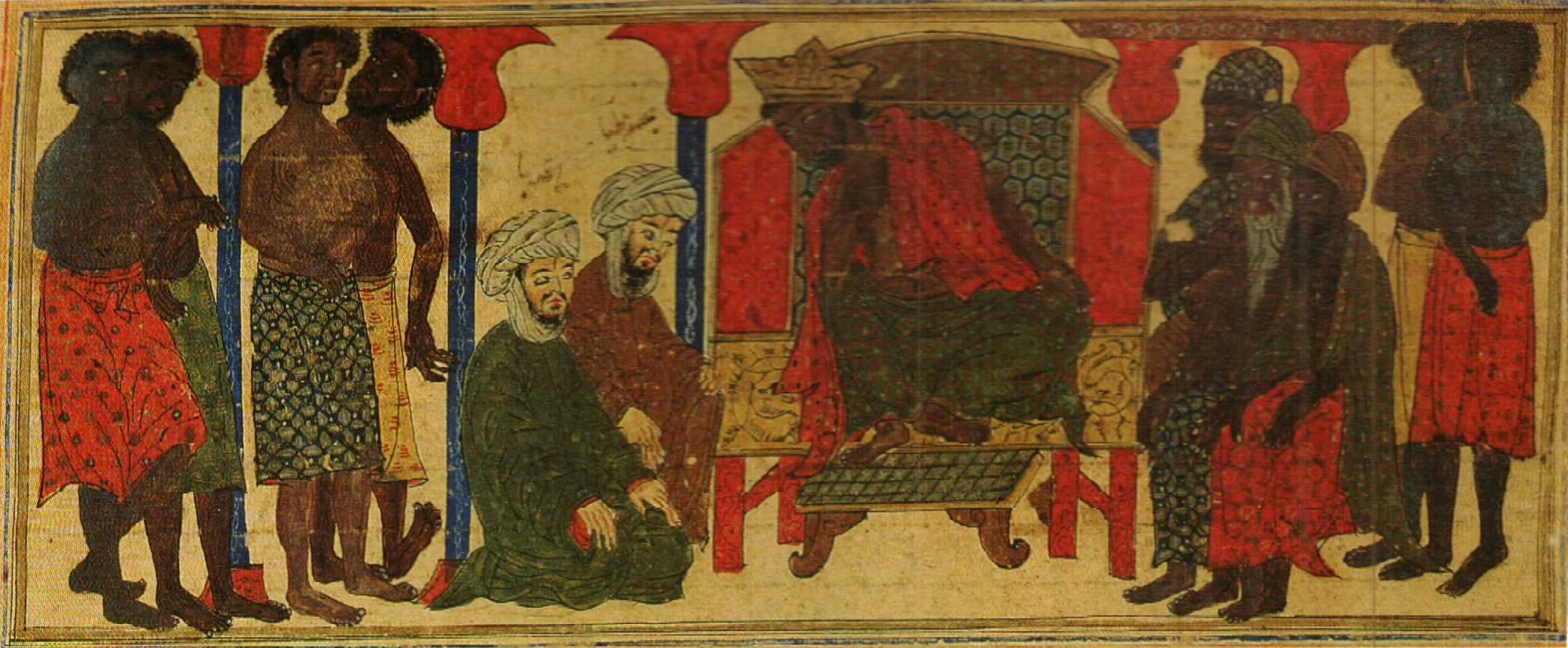
Manuscript illustration by Rashi ad-Din's "World History", depicting the Negus of Abyssinia (traditionally attributed to the king of Aksum) declining the request of a Meccan delegation, which was attempting to persuade him to yield up the Muslims, 1314

The Najashi (Arabic: ٱلنَّجَاشِيّ, romanized: al-Najāshī) is an Arabic term, a loanword from the word negus (Ge'ez: ንጉሥ, lit. 'king'), and refers to the ruler of the Kingdom of Aksum who reigned from 614 to 630. It is agreed by Muslim scholars that Najashi gave shelter to early Muslim refugees from Mecca, around 615–616 at Aksum.

== Muslim accounts ==
=== First Hijra ===
The Najashi and the early Muslim migration to Abyssinia, also known as the First Hijra, are not explicitly mentioned in the Quran but several passages are traditionally connected to the story through the hadith and sīrah texts. According to the Sirat Rasul Allah by Ibn Ishaq, in 615 CE, Muhammad told his followers who were facing persecution in Mecca:

“If you were to go to Abyssinia (it would be better for you), for the king will not tolerate injustice and it is a friendly country, until such time as Allah shall relieve you from your distress. (Note: In a different translation as passed down through Ibn Hisham, Muhammad said, "Why do you not go away to the land of the Abyssinians, for there is a king there under whom no one is wronged, and it is a land of uprightness; (and remain there) until God gives you relief from this present situation.")

Ibn Ishaq recounts how Ja'far ibn Abi Talib, a companion and cousin of Muhammad, led a delegation of Muslims including Uthman ibn Affan on a migration to Habesha (Abyssinia). A larger group of Muslims moved to the land on a second migration after which, according to Tafsir Ibn Kathir, the followers of Muhammad who lived in what is present-day Ethiopia numbered three times more than those that remained in Mecca. Abd Allah b. Abi Rabi'a b. al-Mughira and Amr bin al-As bin Wa'il, two Qurayshite leaders opposed to the Muslims, bearing gifts for the Najashi and his generals, were sent to Abyssinia to petition the Najashi to expel the Muslims from his land.

Despite the advise by his generals who had received their gifts earlier, the Najashi refused to immediately expel the Muslims and invited the Muslims to his court to respond. According to Ibn Ishaq, the Najashi asked the Muslims about their religion and Ja'far ibn Abi Talib responded by saying that before Islam they "were an uncivilized people, worshipping idols, eating corpses, committing abominations, breaking natural ties, treating guests badly, and our strong devoured our weak." He recited Surat Maryam (19:16-36) to the Najashi.

=== Conversion to Islam and funeral prayer ===
According to Muslim accounts, the Najashi converted to Islam. When he died in 630, those sources indicate that Muhammad prayed an absentee funeral prayer (Arabic: صَلَاة الْغَائِب, romanized: Ṣalāt al-Ġāʾib) in al-Baqi Cemetery, Medina which is performed for the departed soul of a Muslim.

== Identification with historical Axumite king ==
Not much is known about his personal life and reign of the Najashi other than that during his reign, Muslims migrated to Abyssinia and met its ruler.

Arabic sources state the king's name was "Ella-Seham", occasionally written as variant names "Ashama", "Asmaha", "Sahama" and "Asbeha". Ethiopian regnal lists record multiple kings named "Saham" or "Ella Saham", but all of them reigned before Kaleb (ab. 534) and are too early in the chronology for any of their reigns to coincide with the migration to Abyssinia. Ethiopian sources instead state that a different king named Adriaz was a contemporary of prophet Muhammad. An unpublished manuscript dates his reign to 603–623 E.C. According to Alaqa Taye Gabra Mariam, the Muslim migration took place in 620 E.C. and coincided with the reign of Aderaz.

== Sources ==
- al-Bukhari, Imam (2013). "The Beginnings of Islam; Section:XIV the Death of the Negus". Sahih al-Bukhari: The Early Years of Islam. Translated by Muhammad Asad. The Other Press. pp. 174, 179. ISBN 978-967-506-298-8.
- Budge, E. A. (1928). A History of Ethiopia: Nubia and Abyssinia (Volume I). London: Methuen & Co.
- Dillmann, August (1853). "Zur Geschichte des abyssinischen Reichs". Zeitschrift der Deutschen Morgenländischen Gesellschaft (in German). 7: 338–364.
- Donzel, Emeri van (24 April 2012). "al-Nad̲j̲ās̲h̲ī". In Bearman, P.J. (ed.). Encyclopaedia of Islam (2nd ed.). Brill. ISBN 9789004265042.
- Gabra Maryam, Alaqa Tayya (1987). History of the People of Ethiopia (in Amharic and English). Translated by Grover Hudson; Tekeste Negash. Uppsala: Centre for Multiethnic Research (Uppsala University – Faculty of Arts). ISBN 91-86624-12-1. ISSN 0281-448X.
- Ibn Ishaq, Muhammad (1955). السيرة النبوية (Sirat Rasul Allah) [The Life of Muhammad]. Translated by Guillaume, Alfred. Oxford University Press.
- Hijazi, Abu Tariq (2014-03-28). "Najashi: The king who supported Muslim emigrants". Arab News.
- Öztürk, Levent (2006). "Necâşî Ashame" (in Turkish). İslâm Ansiklopedisi.
- Numrich, Paul D. (January 2023). "Selective Appeal to the Negus Narratives: A Case Study in Interreligious Relations". Journal of Interreligious Studies. 38: 44−61. Archived from the original on 2023-02-05.
- Mekouria, Tekle-Tsadik (1988). "The Horn of Africa". In M. Elfasi; Hrbek, Ivan (eds.). Africa from the Seventh to the Eleventh Century. UNESCO. ISBN 978-9-2310-1709-4.
- "The Book of Prayer - Funerals". Sahih Muslim. 951–953.
- Sellassie, Sergew Hable (1972). Ancient and Medieval Ethiopian History to 1270. Addis Ababa: United Printers.
- Swetzoff, Sara (August 4, 2022). "The First Hijra as a Model for Migration Justice: Ethiopia's Legacy and Future in Regional Peacebuilding". Sylff.
- Watt, W. Montgomery (1953). Muhammad at Mecca. Oxford. ISBN 9780199067169.
