= Kinaidokolpitai =

Ancient people of Arabia

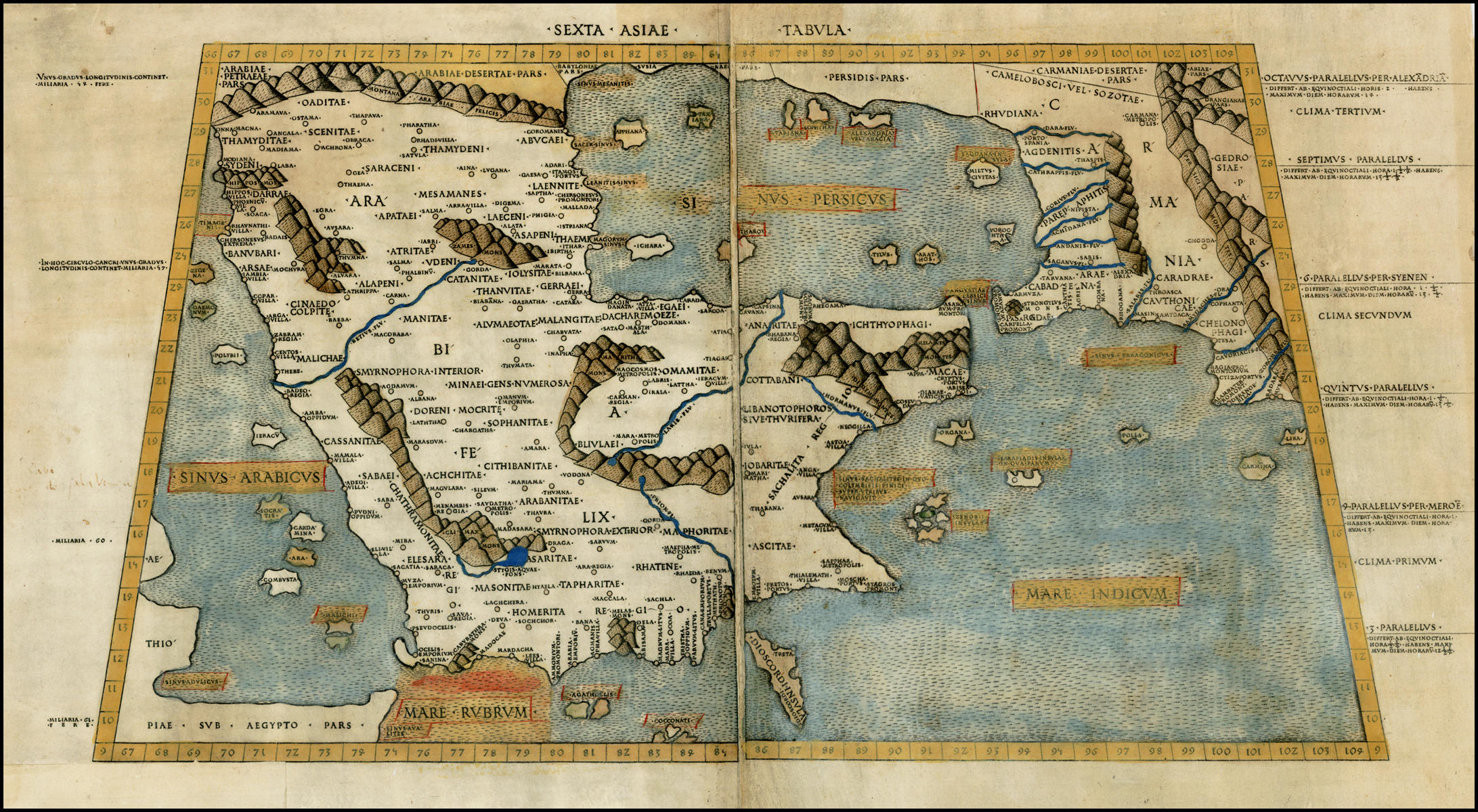
Map of the Arabian Peninsula based on Jacopo d'Angelo's translation of Ptolemy (1478). The Cinaedocolpitae are located in the northwest.

The Kinaidokolpitai were a people inhabiting the Hejaz in western Arabia in the 2nd and 3rd centuries AD, according to Greek and Latin authors. They are known from a small number of independent sources. Their capital was Zambram, but none of the named settlements in their territory can be identified with certainty. Their name is possibly related to that of Kinda, Kinana, Kalb, Kilab or some combination of two of these tribes. For a time they were raiders and pirates preying on the incense trade until defeated by the Kingdom of Aksum, which imposed tribute on them.

== Name ==
The name is sometimes anglicized Kinaidokolpites. The earliest attested Latinization is Cinaedocolpitae. The name is usually spelled Kinaidokolpitai (Κιναιδοκολπίται) with an initial kappa in Greek, but in one instance it is spelled Chinedakolpitai (Χινεδακολπιται) with an initial chi. This is relevant to any consideration of a Semitic rather than Greek origin, since it suggests that the Semitic etymon could begin with either kaph or qoph.

If read literally in Greek, the name is composed of κίναιδος (homosexual, pervert) and κολπίτης (those living on a gulf). Glen Bowersock interprets this as an obscenity (if Greek), but Hélène Cuvigny and Christian Robin consider it to have a more positive connotation associated with erotic dancers (to which κίναιδος could also refer).

The first part of the name may relate to the later Arab tribe of Kinda, deliberately rendered in Greek in a pejorative form. Carlo Conti Rossini interpreted it as "Kinda living on the shore of the gulf". Hermann von Wissmann saw it as combining the names of the Kināna and Kalb tribes. Mikhail Bukharin, taking the first element as Kinda, thinks the second part could be either the Kalb or more likely the Kilāb. Laurence Kirwan identifies them with the Kināna.

== Location ==
In Ptolemy's Geography, dated to about 150, the Kinaidokolpitai are described as inhabiting the Arabian coast of the Red Sea. Their territory began after Iambia (probably Yanbu) and the tribe of Arsai (probably the Irasha, a clan of the Bali). It encompassed, from north to south: the villages of Kopar (Note: Unidentified, perhaps the port of Coboea mentioned by Pliny the Elder or the modern village of al-Jār in Saudi Arabia.) and Arga (Agar); (Note: Unidentified, perhaps the ancient port of Rabigh or ʿIrq al-Ghurāb at the entrance to the port of Jeddah. It is not likely to correspond to the interior toponym al-ʿArg (al-ʿIrq).) the city of Zambram, (Note: Certain manuscripts give the spelling Zabram or Zambra, older editions of the Geography sometimes Zaaram. It is probably to be identified with Ẓahrān, name of both a wādī between Jeddah and Mecca and a village. Qaryat al-Faw has been identified as the capital of Kinda.) their capital; the village of Kentos (Kentosi, Kantosi); (Note: Unidentified, perhaps the village of Qaryat Kinda near Jeddah or al-Qunfudha.) and the city of Thebai. (Note: Two Greek spellings are found in the manuscripts for this place: Θεβαι and Θηβαι. It is probably the same place as the Tabis mentioned by Stephanus of Byzantium and probably also related to the name of the Debai, a tribe mentioned by Strabo and Agatharchides. It has been identified with Dhahabān or Ṣabyā. It may be the place called Ṭabya or Ṭayba by al-Hamdani.) The southern limit of their land was the river Baitios, probably the wādī Bayḑ or Baysh, beyond which lived the Kassanitai. (Note: These are probably the people called Casani (Pliny), Gasandoi (Diodorus Siculus) or Kasandreis (Photios) in other sources. Their name has also been linked to that of the wādī of Jazān or to a place called Kisān in the ʿAsīr.) These are probably the Ghassānids before they migrated north. This places their southern limit in the northern ʿAsīr roughly opposite the Farasan Islands. Ptolemy also places an unnamed mountain in the territory of the Kinaidokolpitai. It has been identified with the Jabal Shār in Midian, north of Yanbu.

The Kinaidokolpitai next appear as one of the peoples subdued by the king of Aksum (Note: His name is unknown, possibly he is Sembrouthes or Gadarat.) according to the Adulis throne inscription, which dates from some time between the mid-2nd and early 3rd century. It is possibly contemporary with or even a little earlier than Ptolemy. There are two slightly different ways of translating this inscription:

I sent both a fleet and an army of infantry against the Arabitai and the Kinaidocolpitai who dwell across the Red Sea, and I brought their kings under my rule. I commanded them to pay tax on their land and to travel in peace by land and sea. I made war from Leuke Kome to the lands of the Sabaeans.

And I sent a fleet and land forces against the Arabitae and Cinaedocolpitae who dwelt on the other side of the Red Sea, and having reduced the sovereigns of both, I imposed on them a land tribute and charged them to make travelling safe both by sea and by land. I thus subdued the whole coast from Leuce Come to the country of the Sabaeans.

Regarding the location of the Kinaidokolpitai, the inscriptions says only that it lay between former Nabataean port of Leuke Kome (Note: The location of Leuke Kome is not known with certainty, it may have been near Yanbu but is more usually placed at the mouth of the Gulf of Aqaba.) and the land of Sabaʾ, as did that of Arabitai. These latter people are not otherwise attested (Note: It is found in reference to the people living along the river Arabis in India, but this usage is obviously unrelated.) and their name seems to be a doublet of Arabes (Arabs), although some scholars have identified them with the Kassanitai of Ptolemy. Von Wissman thought the Kinaidokolpitai were the coast-dwellers and the Arabitai the Bedouin of the interior. Cosmas Indicopleustes, who copied the now lost inscription in 548 or 549, glosses Arabitai and Kinaidokolpitai as "the inhabitants of Arabia Felix", which is uninformative.

== History ==
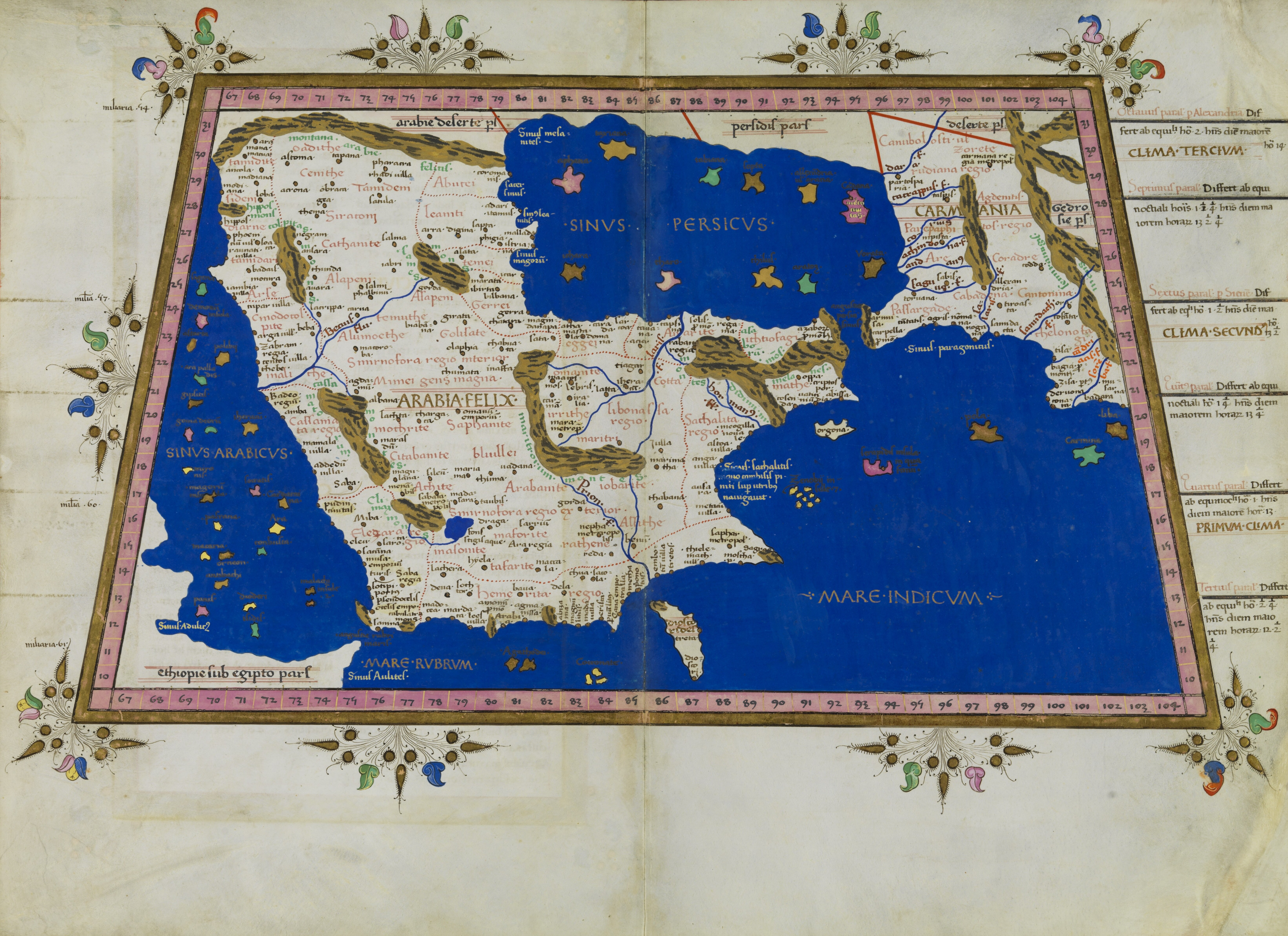
Map of Arabia based on Jacopo d'Angelo's translation of Ptolemy (1467). The name is spelled Cinodocolpite.

In the Collection of Chronologies, written in 235, presents the Kinaidokolpitai as colonists from Midian. The author has probably identified them with the Kenites of the Bible (Septuagint Kinaioi), an identification he may have found strengthened by the spellings in Josephus (Kenetidai and Keneaidai). Nevertheless, the lands of the Kinaidokolpitai may at some point have extended northwest into former Nabataean lands.

The earliest reference to the Kinaidokolpitai is an ostrakon found at Maximianon in Egypt and dated to 118 or perhaps closer 150. It records that two soldiers of the garrison, probably cavalrymen, were sent out on the 20th of the month Tobi "with a diploma (official missive) concerning the Chinedakolpitai".

The implication of the Adulis throne inscription is that in the middle of the 2nd century or early in the 3rd, the Kinaidokolpitai were raiding the incense route, both its sea-lanes and overland roads, that connected South Arabia and the Horn of Africa with the Roman Empire. The main Aksumite port of Adulis, where the throne inscription was found, was located on the incense route.

The Kinaidokolpitai are listed in Stephanus of Byzantium's Ethnika (5th century). All his information is derived from other written sources, such as Ptolemy and Marcian of Heracleia (who wrote at an unknown date). He gives the capital of the Kinaidokolpitai as Zadrame and quotes Marcian placing the Kinaidokolpitai alongside the Zadramites. His testimony cannot be taken as evidence for the continued existence of the Kinaidokolpitai in his time.

== Bibliography ==
- Bowersock, Glen W. (1996). "Exploration in North-West Arabia after Jaussen-Savignac". Topoi. Orient-Occident. 6 (2): 553–563.
- Bowersock, Glen W. (2013). The Throne of Adulis: Red Sea Wars on the Eve of Islam. Oxford University Press. ISBN 978-0-19-973932-5.
- Bukharin, Mikhail D. (2009). "Towards the Earliest History of Kinda" (PDF). Arabian Archaeology and Epigraphy. 20 (1): 64–80.
- Claudius Ptolemy (1991) [1937]. The Geography. Translated by Edward Luther Stevenson. Dover.
- Cuvigny, Hélène; Robin, Christian (1996). "Des Kinaidokolpites dans un ostracon grec du désert oriental (Égypte)". Topoi. Orient-Occident. 6 (2): 697–720.
- Hatke, George (2013). Aksum and Nubia: Warfare, Commerce, and Political Fictions in Ancient Northeast Africa. New York University Press. JSTOR j.ctt9qgh3z.
- Kirwan, L. P. (1972). "The Christian Topography and the Kingdom of Axum". The Geographical Journal. 138 (2): 166–177. JSTOR 1795960.
- McCrindle, J. W., ed. (1897). The Christian Topography of Cosmas, an Egyptian Monk: Translated from the Greek, and Edited with Notes and Introduction. Hakluyt Society.
- von Wissmann, Hermann (1960). "Badw, II. The History of the Origin of Nomadism in its Geographical Aspect, (c) Bedouin Nomadism in Arabia". In Gibb, H. A. R.; Kramers, J. H.; Lévi-Provençal, E.; Schacht, J.; Lewis, B. & Pellat, Ch. (eds.). The Encyclopaedia of Islam, Second Edition. Volume I: A–B. Leiden: E. J. Brill. pp. 880–887. OCLC 495469456.
