= GDRT =

200–230 C.E ruler of the Kingdom of Aksum

King of Axum
- Reign: c.200 – 230
- Successor: ʽDBH
- Issue: BYGT

GDRT (also GDR, vocalized by historians as Gadarat) was a king of the Kingdom of Aksum (c. 200), known for being the first king to involve Aksum in South Arabian affairs. He is known primarily from inscriptions in South Arabia that mention him and his son BYGT (also vocalized as "Beyga" or "Beygat"). GDRT has been equated with the anonymous king of the Monumentum Adulitanum located off the coast of Zula in the ancient settlement of Adulis located in modern day Eritrea, which would date his reign c. 200 – c. 230. However, the two rulers are sometimes thought to be distinct. Further, the French scholar Christian Robin, studying the inscriptions at al-Mis`al in Yemen, has shown that GDRT and his successor `DBH lived in the earlier half of the 3rd century. GDRT is also thought to be the same person as GDR, the name inscribed on a bronze wand or sceptre that was found in an area near Atsbi and Dar'a/Addi-Galamo in northern Ethiopia.

== Aksumite inscription ==
The inscriptions of GDR represent the oldest surviving royal inscriptions in the Ge'ez alphabet. The oldest of these was found at Addi-Galamo in the regions of Atsbi and Dar'a in eastern Tigray Region in northern Ethiopia. The area is rich in pre-Aksumite artifacts, and inscriptions of a pre-Aksumite kingdom called Dʿmt have been found in the region. The inscription mentioning GDR is the only evidence of his existence from the western side of the Red Sea:

gdr / ngśy / ʾksm / tbʿl / mzlt / lʾrg / wllmq

The Addi Galamo inscription was written on a sceptre or "boomerang-like object"; the linguist A.J. Drewes therefore interprets mzlt as meaning a sceptre or royal emblem. The inscription's meaning is uncertain, but if mzlt is taken to mean a sceptre, and ʾrg and lmq are taken to be place names (or sanctuaries), then, according to Alexander Sima, the text could mean "GDR, king of Aksum gave (this) sceptre into the possession of (the sanctuaries) ʾRG and LMQ." The South Arabian expert W.F. Albert Jamme, however, translates the inscription as "GDR king of Aksum occupied the passages of `RG and LMQ", or "Gedara, King of Axum is humbled before the [gods] Arg and Almouqah," (i.e. Almaqah or Ilmuqah), assuming that the ʾ in Ilmuqah was assimilated.

== South Arabian involvement ==
The Horn of Africa and South Arabia at the end of GDRT's era. part of the Himyarite-Axsumite war 270-272.

GDRT is first mentioned in South Arabian inscriptions as an ally of `Alhan Nahfan, king of Saba, in an inscription at Maḥram Bilqīs, at Ma'rib in Yemen, the temple of the moon god Almaqah /Ilmuqah. According to Stuart Munro-Hay, the inscription reads

they agreed together that their war and their peace should be in unison, against anyone that might rise up against them, and that in safety and in security there should be allied together Salhen and Zararan and `Alhan and Gadarat.

Alexander Sima translates the text slightly differently, specifying that it was GDRT who "sent a diplomatic mission to [`Ahlan] in order to form an alliance." Both interpret "Zararan" or "Zrrn" as the name of the palace in Aksum at the time, parallel to "Sahlen," the palace of Saba in Marib. This Sahlen-Saba parallel, along with the Dhu-Raydan-Ḥimyar parallel, was often used by Aksumite kings in their inscriptions enumerating the territories under their control. A Ḥimyarite inscription confirms the Sabaean text, mentioning that Aksum, Saba', Ḥaḑramawt, and Qatabān were all allied against Ḥimyar. `Alhan Nafhan's son Sha`ir Awtar or Sha`irum Awtar later abandoned the alliance with GDRT after he became king of Saba'. However, during the first part of Sha`ir Awtar's reign, the two powers seem to have joined in an alliance once again, this time against Ḥaḑramawt. Saba's invasion of Ḥaḑramawt with Aksumite help culminated in the latter's defeat and the occupation of its capital, Shabwah, in 225. Sha`ir Awtar's attack represented a major shift in policy as, before the attack, the king of Ḥaḑramawt, Il`azz Yalut, was married to his sister; he had even helped suppress a revolt against Il`azz Yalut.

Although Saba' was previously allied with Aksum against Ḥimyar, both Ḥimyarite and Sabaean troops were used in the attack against Ḥaḑramawt. Immediately following the conquest of Hadramaut, Sha`ir Awtar allied with Ḥimyar against his former ally GDRT. A second Sabaean inscription from the sanctuary 'Awam in Marib during the reign of Sha`ir Awtar's successor, Luha`atht Yarhum, describes events in the latter part of his predecessor's reign. The inscription tells of a diplomatic mission sent by Sha`ir Awtar to GDRT, the results of which are unknown; however, the text later goes on to describe a war between Saba' and Aksum in the southern highlands of Yemen, indicating that the negotiations were unsuccessful. Aksum lost a battle as a result of the Saba'-Ḥimyar alliance, allowing the South Arabian forces to expel GDRT's son BYGT and his forces from the Ḥimyarite capital Zafar, which had previously been held by Aksum after the Aksum-Ḥaḑramawt-Qatabān-Saba' alliance. Despite this loss, Aksum still held territory in South Arabia, as evidenced by inscriptions of Luha`atht Yarhum (r. c. 230), which detail at least one known clash with hbšt troops in Yemen after GDRT's reign. Peace may have been established after GDRT's death, but war and Aksumite involvement was renewed under his successors such as `DBH and GRMT, and the whole 3rd century was to be dominated by Aksumite-Yemenite conflicts.

== Legacy ==
GDRT was most likely the first Aksumite king to be involved in South Arabian affairs, as well as the first known king to be mentioned in South Arabian inscriptions. His reign resulted in the control of much of western Yemen, such as the Tihāmah, Najrā, Ma`afir, Ẓafār (until c. 230), and parts of Hashid territory around Hamir in the northern highlands. Furthermore, GDRT's military alliances and his conquests in Yemen and Saudi Arabia, the required formidable fleet for such feats, and the extension of Aksumite influence throughout Yemen and southern Saudi Arabia all reflect a new zenith in Aksumite power. His involvement would mark the beginning of centuries of Aksumite involvement in South Arabia, culminating with the full-scale invasion of Yemen by King Kaleb in 520 (or 525), resulting in the establishment of an Aksumite province covering all of South Arabia.

GDRT's name may be preserved in Ethiopian tradition through the traditional king lists, as what seem to be variants of his name crop up in three of them. Gədur is listed as the third king in list C, Zegduru (ze meaning 'of' in Ge'ez) appears as the sixth in list E, and Zegdur appears as the third in list B, after the legendary Menelik I. Zegdur also is mentioned in at least one hagiography and short chronicle. The king lists were composed centuries after the fall of the Aksumite kingdom, however, and generally do not agree with archaeological records except when concerning famous kings.

== See also ==
- History of Eritrea
- History of Ethiopia
- Kingdom of Aksum
- List of kings of Axum
- History of Yemen
- Sabaeans
- Himyar
- Hadhramaut

Regnal titles
Unknown Last known title holder: Zoskales	King of Axum	Succeeded by `DBH
