= African Greeks =

Ethnic group in Africa

Έλληνες της Αφρικής

Languages
- Greek · Local languages

Religion
- Christianity: Coptic · Greek

Related ethnic groups
- Egyptian Greeks · Ethiopian Greeks · Sudanese Greeks · Roman Africans

African Greeks, or Greeks in Africa (Greek: Έλληνες της Αφρικής), are the Greek people in the continent of Africa. Greek communities have existed in Africa since antiquity.

== Ancient Egypt ==
Greeks have been present in Egypt since at least the 7th century BC. Herodotus visited ancient Egypt in the 5th century BC and claimed that the Greeks were one of the first groups of foreigners that ever lived there. Diodorus Siculus claimed that Rhodian Actis, one of the Heliadae, built the city of Heliopolis before the cataclysm; likewise the Athenians built Sais. Siculus reports that all the Greek cities were destroyed during the cataclysm, but the Egyptian cities including Heliopolis and Sais survived.

=== First historical colonies ===
According to Herodotus (ii. 154), King Psammetichus I (664–610 BC) established a garrison of foreign mercenaries at Daphnae, mostly Carians and Ionian Greeks.

In 7th century BC, after the Greek Dark Ages from 1100 to 750 BC, the city of Naucratis was founded in Ancient Egypt. It was located on the Canopic branch of the Nile river, 45 mi (72 km) from the open sea. It was the first and, for much of its early history, the only permanent Greek colony in Egypt; acting as a symbiotic nexus for the interchange of Greek and Egyptian art and culture.

At about the same time, the city of Heracleion, the closest to the sea, became an important port for Greek trade. It had a famous temple of Heracles. The city later sank into the sea, only to be rediscovered recently.

From the time of Psammetichus I onwards, Greek mercenary armies played an important role in some of the Egyptian wars. One such army was led by Mentor of Rhodes. Another such personage was Phanes of Halicarnassus.

=== Hellenistic times ===
==== Rule of Alexander the Great (332–323 BC) ====
Alexander the Great conquered Egypt at an early stage of his conquests. He respected the pharaonic religions and customs and he was proclaimed Pharaoh of Egypt. He established the city of Alexandria. After his death, in 323 BC, his empire was divided among his generals. Egypt was given to Ptolemy I Soter, whose descendants would give Egypt her final royal dynasty – a glittering one. The dynasty was composed solely by ethnic Greeks and produced dynasts such as the famous Cleopatra. Its capital was Alexandria. Ptolemy added legitimacy to his rule in Egypt by acquiring Alexander's body. He intercepted the embalmed corpse on its way to burial, brought it to Egypt, and placed it in a golden coffin in Alexandria. It would remain one of the famous sights of the town for many years, until probably destroyed in riots in the 3rd century AD.

==== The Ptolemaic Empire (323–30 BC) ====
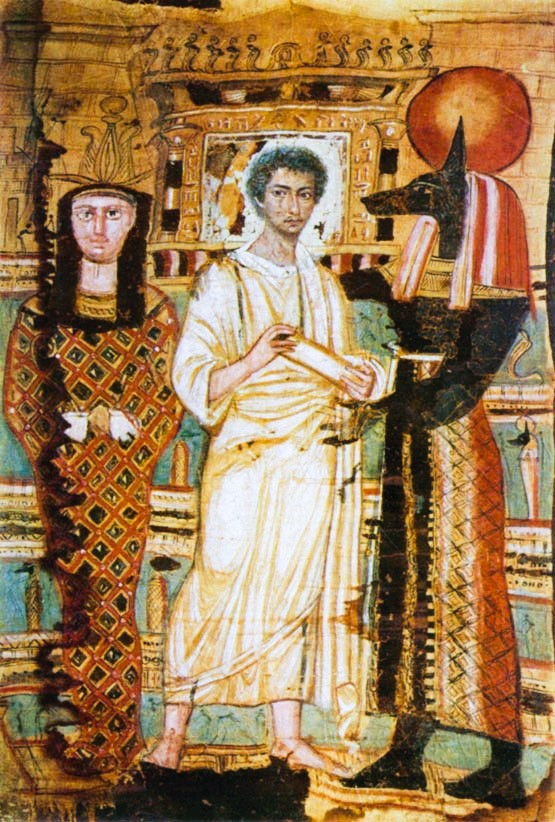
An Egyptian Greek man with Anubis

The initial objective of Ptolemy's reign was to establish firm and broad boundaries to his newly acquired kingdom. That led to almost continuous warfare against other leading members of Alexander's circle. At times he held Cyprus and even parts of mainland Greece. When these conflicts were over, he was firmly in control of Egypt and had strong claims (disputed by the Seleucid dynasty) to Palestine. He called himself king of Egypt from 306 BC. By the time he abdicated in 285 BC, in favour of one of his sons, the Ptolemaic dynasty was secure. Ptolemy and his descendants showed respect to Egypt's most cherished traditions – those of religion – and turned them to their own advantage.

Alexandria became the centre of the Greek and Hellenistic world and the centre of international commerce, art and science. The Lighthouse of Alexandria was one of the Seven Wonders of the Ancient World while during the reign of Ptolemy II Philadelphus, the Library of Alexandria was the biggest library in the world until it was destroyed. The last Pharaoh was a Greek princess, Cleopatra VII, who took her own life in 30 BC, a year after the battle of Actium.

=== Roman and Byzantine Egypt ===
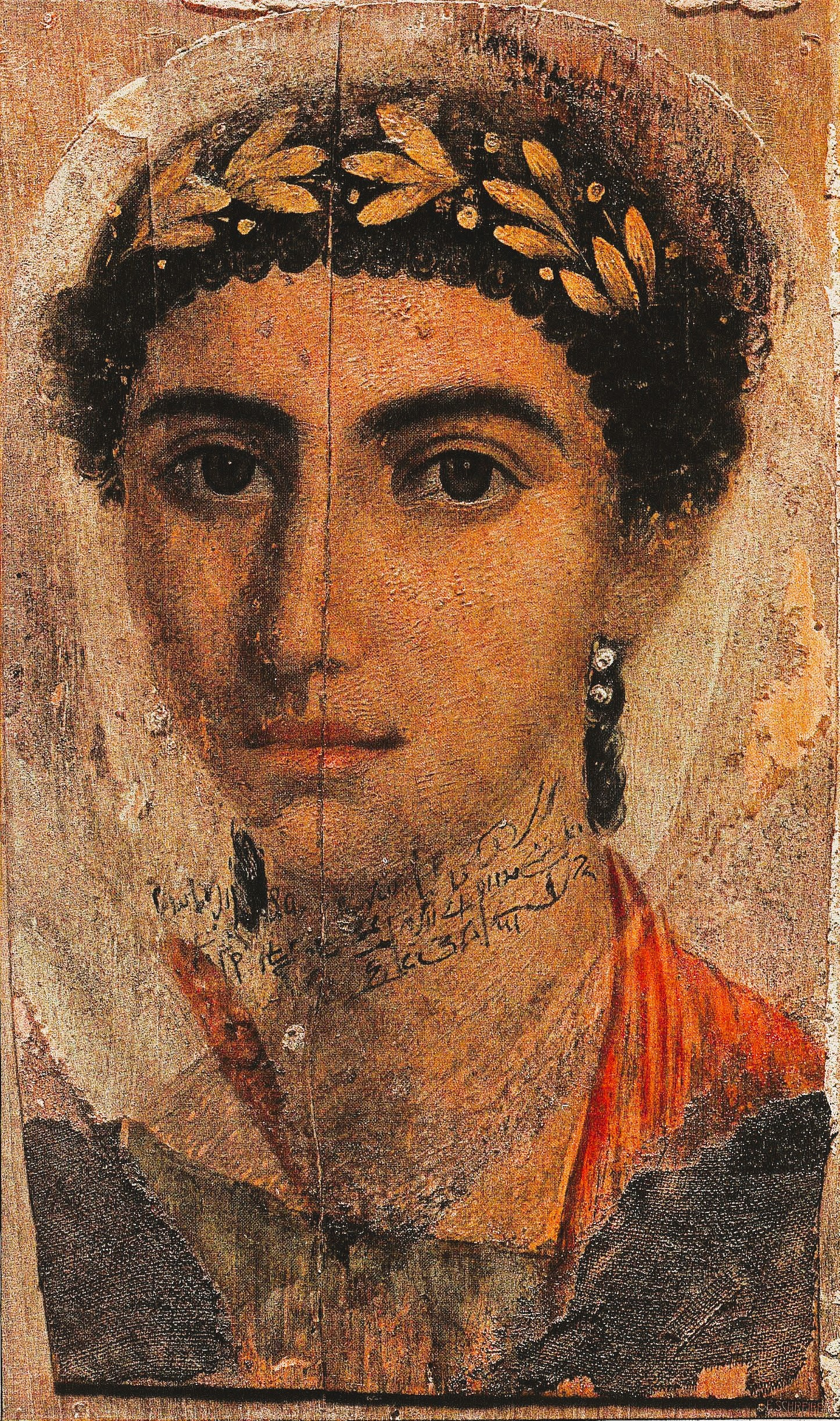
Mummy portrait of a woman named Eirene (Εἰρήνη), 1st c. AD.

After its conquest by the Roman forces in 30 BC, Egypt became a province of the new Roman Empire and remained an Eastern Roman territory until the Muslim conquest of Egypt in 641. Under Greco-Roman rule, Egypt hosted several Greek settlements, mostly concentrated in Alexandria, but also in a few other cities, where Greek settlers lived alongside some seven to ten million native Egyptians. Faiyum's earliest Greek inhabitants were soldier-veterans and cleruchs (elite military officials) who were settled by the Ptolemaic kings on reclaimed lands. Native Egyptians also came to settle in Faiyum from all over the country, notably the Nile Delta, Upper Egypt, Oxyrhynchus and Memphis, to undertake the labor involved in the land reclamation process, as attested by personal names, local cults and recovered papyri.

Christianity probably arrived in Egypt among the Hellenized Alexandrian Jews, from Palestine's communities of Jewish Christians. The earliest evidence of Christianity in Egypt is a letter written in the first half of the 3rd century and mentioning the gymnasiarch and the boulē (thereby indicating the author and recipient were of the upper class) uses the Christian nomina sacra and the Biblical Greek: ἐν κυρίῳ, romanized: en kyrίōi, lit. 'in the Lord', drawn from the Pauline epistles. The Church in Egypt (Patriarchate of Alexandria) split into the Greek Orthodox Church of Alexandria and the Coptic Orthodox Church of Alexandria following the fourth ecumenical council, the Council of Chalcedon in 451. Some 30,000 Greeks of Chalcedonian persuasion were ranged against some five million Coptic non-Chalcedonians. The Greek Orthodox Church of Alexandria remained in communion with the other patriarchs by accepting the council's decision, and were referred to as melkites ("the King's men", meaning those loyal to the Byzantine emperor).

==== Coptic Greeks ====
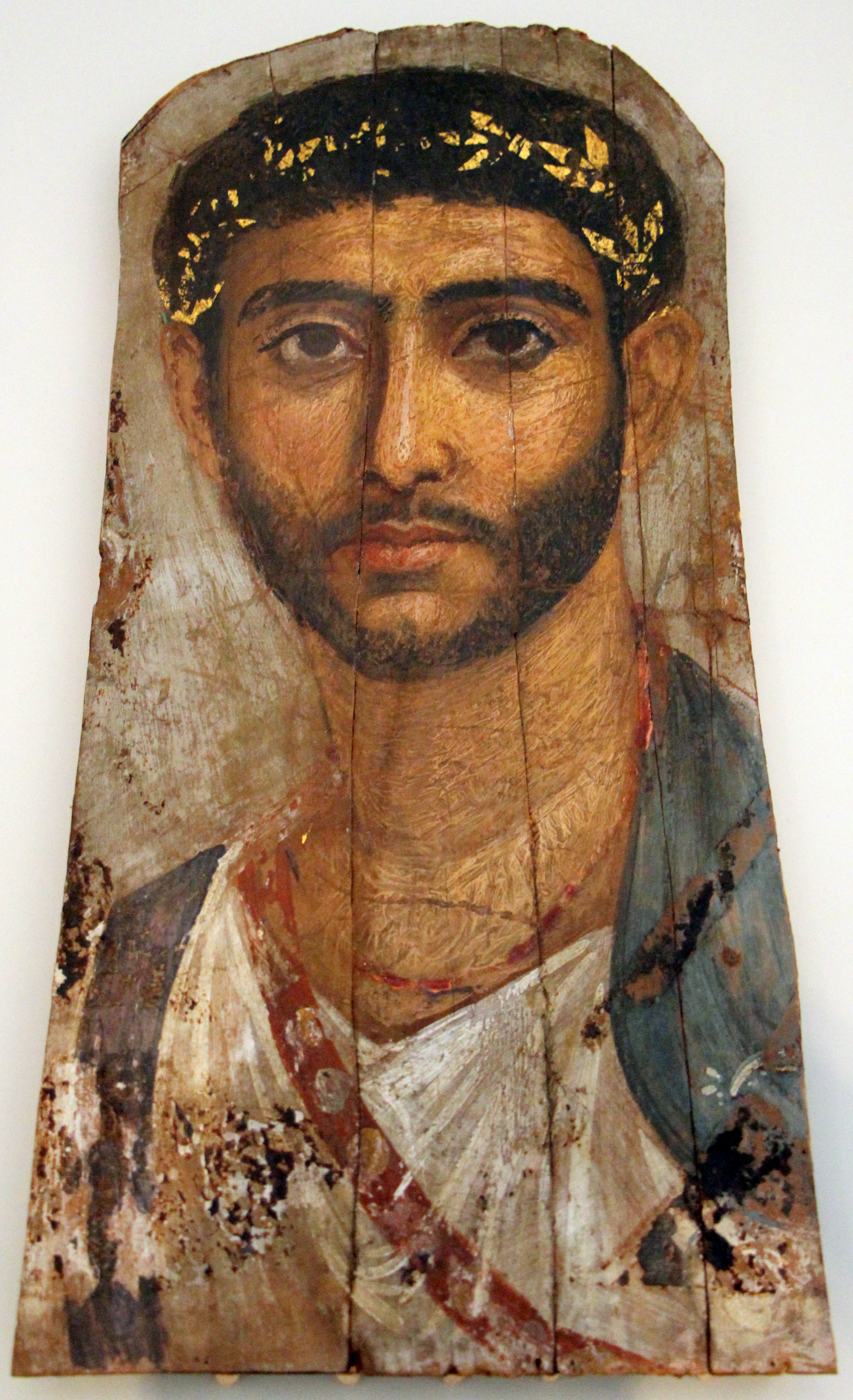
An Egyptian Greek centurion

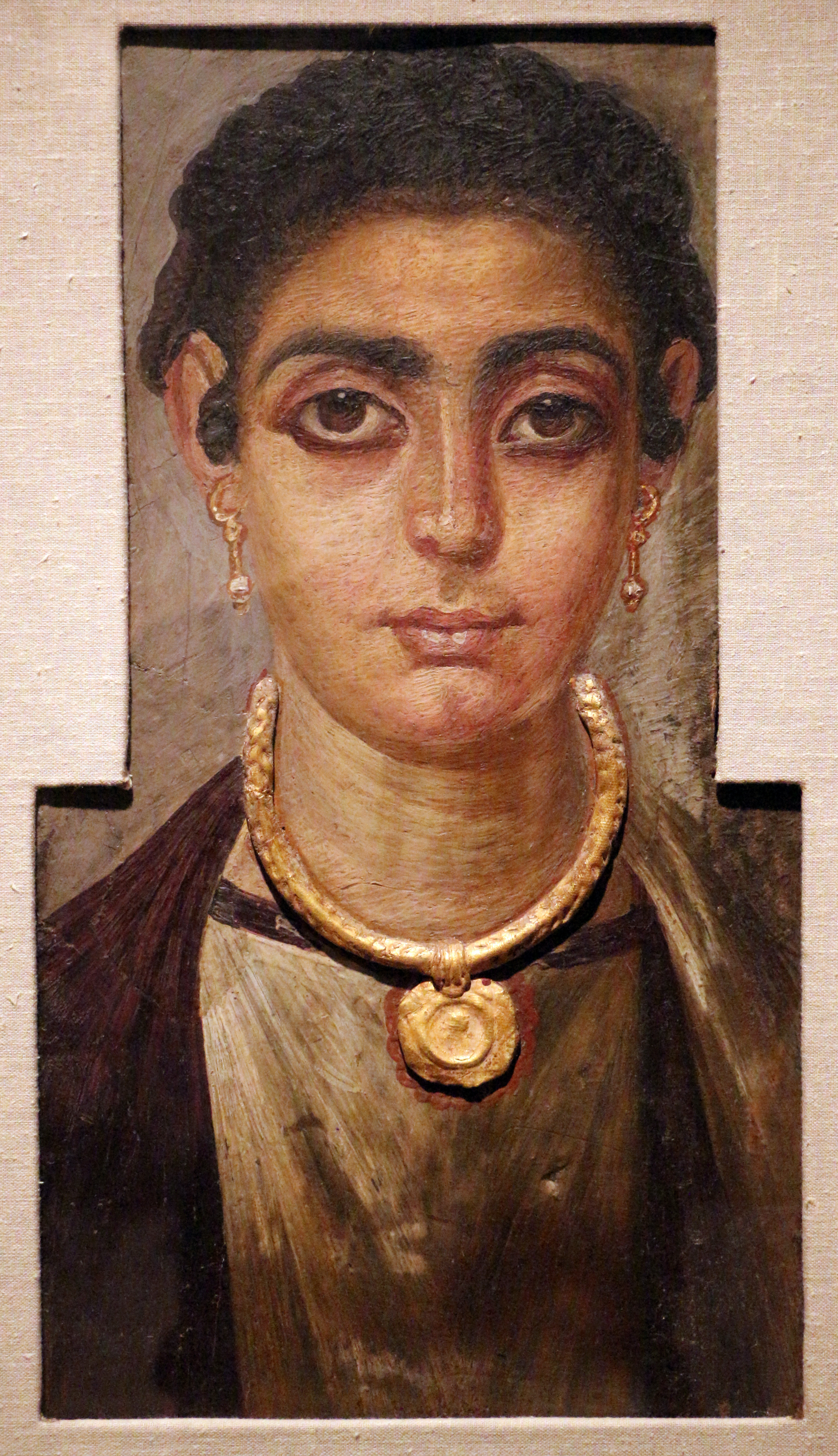
An Egyptian Greek woman

It is estimated that as much as 30 percent of the population of Faiyum was Greek during the Ptolemaic period, with the rest being native Egyptians; the Faiyum mummy portraits reflect the complex synthesis of the predominant Egyptian culture and that of the elite Egyptian Greek minority in Faiyum.

By the Roman period, much of the "Greek" population of Faiyum was made up of either Hellenized Egyptians or people of mixed Egyptian-Greek origins, and by the time of Roman emperor Caracalla in the 2nd century AD, ethnic Egyptians could be distinguished from Egyptian Greeks only by their speech.

Egyptian Greek is the variety of Greek spoken in Egypt from antiquity until the Islamic conquest of Egypt in the 7th century. Egyptian Greek adopted many loanwords from Egyptian language; there was a great deal of intracommunity bilingualism in Egypt.

The following is an example of Egyptian Greek language, used in the Coptic Church:

ⲇⲟⲝⲁ ⲡⲁⲧⲣⲓ ⲕⲉ ⲩⲓⲱ: ⲕⲉ ⲁ̀ⲅⲓⲱ ⲡⲛⲉⲩⲙⲁⲧⲓ: ⲕⲉ ⲛⲩⲛ ⲕⲉ ⲁ̀ⲓ̀ ⲕⲉ ⲓⲥ ⲧⲟⲩⲥ ⲉⲱⲛⲁⲥ ⲧⲱⲛ ⲉ̀ⲱ̀ⲛⲱⲛ ⲁ̀ⲙⲏⲛ

Δόξα Πατρὶ κὲ Υἱῷ κὲ Ἁγίῳ Πνεύματι, κὲ νῦν κὲ ἀῒ κὲ ἰς τοὺς ἐῶνας τῶν ἐώνων. Ἀμήν.

Glory to the Father, to the Son, and to the Holy Spirit, both now and always, and unto the ages of ages. Amen.

The dental morphology of the Roman-period Faiyum mummies was also compared with that of earlier Egyptian populations, and was found to be "much more closely akin" to that of ancient Egyptians than to Greeks or other European populations. Victor J. Katz notes that "research in papyri dating from the early centuries of the common era demonstrates that a significant amount of intermarriage took place between the Greek and Egyptian communities".

== Ancient Ethiopia ==
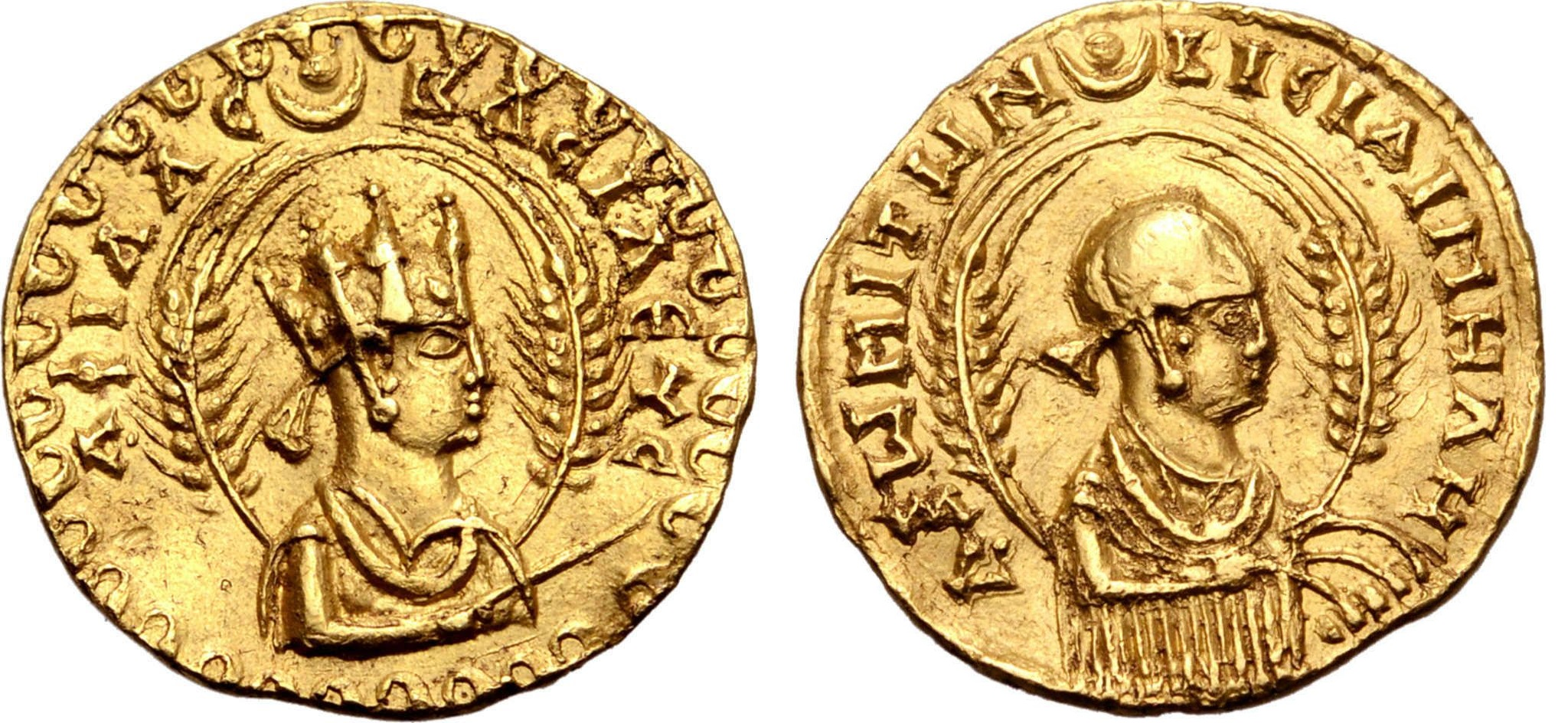
Axumite coinage that reads "AΦIΛAC BACIΛEYC" – "King Aphilas"

The name Ethiopia itself is Greek and means "of burned face". It is first attested in the Homeric epics but it is unlikely to have referred to any particular nation, but rather, to people of African descent in general.

Beginning in the Hellenistic age around the third century BC, Greek culture permeated the regions of ancient Ethiopia. Greeks established colonies in Ethiopia, with Ptolemais Theron and Axum becoming major capitals of Ethiopian Greek culture. In the second century BC, Ptolemy III Euergetes annexed several northern Ethiopian cities such as Tigray and the port of Adulis, which became major trading hubs for Ethiopian Greeks.

=== Axumites of Ethiopia ===
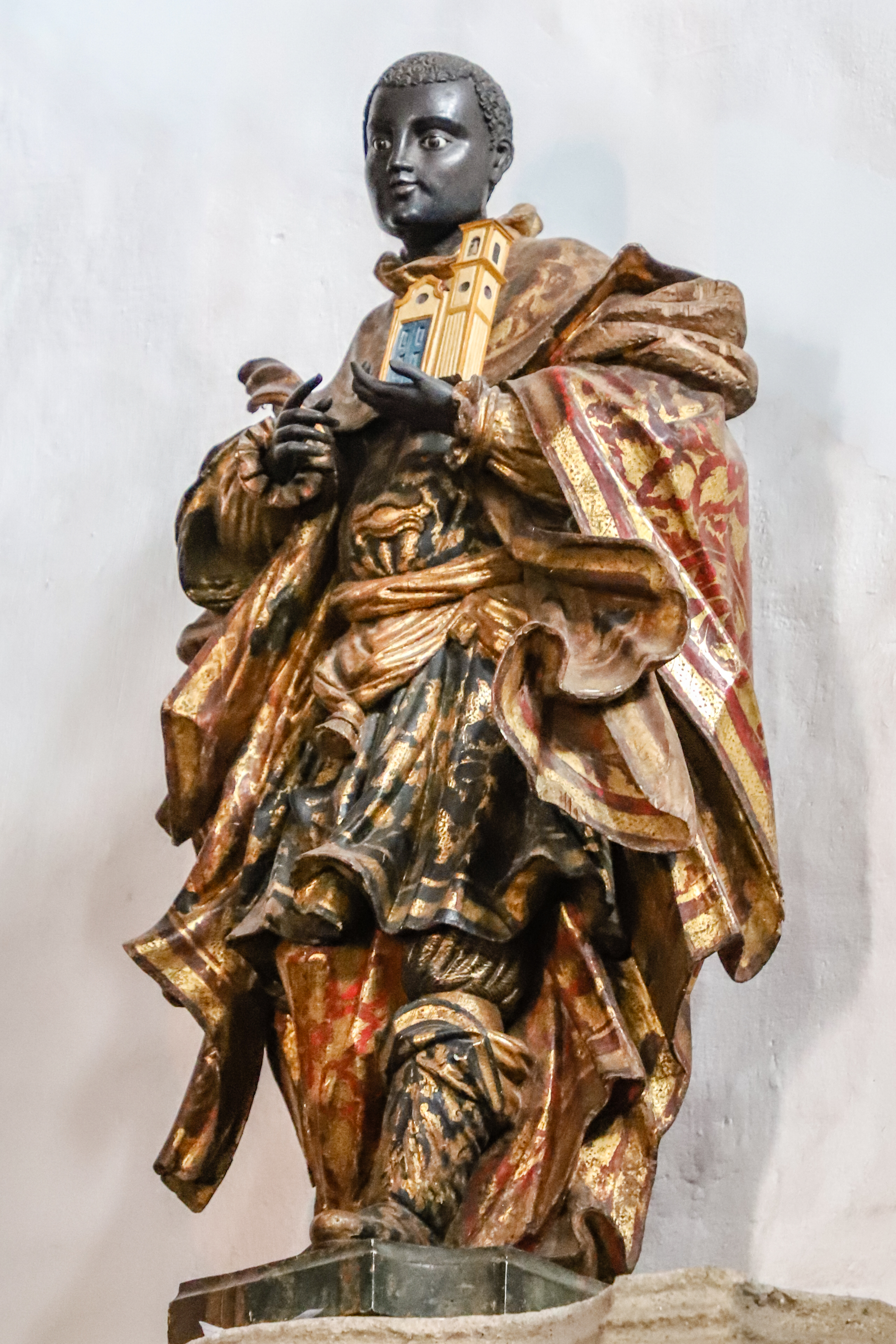
Saint Elesbaan, King of Axum

After the Romans annexed the Ptolemaic Empire, the Axumite king Zoskales (Ancient Greek: Ζωσκάλης) established the Axumite Empire (Ancient Greek: Ἀξωμίτης) (c. 100 AD–c. 960 AD), which maintained Ethiopian Greek culture and used Greek as its lingua franca. In the city of Axum, many obelisks, statues, and architecture made in Egyptian Greek style still mark the landscape.

As the Islamic conquest of North Africa severed Axum's link with the Greek world in the 7th century, Greek culture and knowledge waned; Muslim presence in the Red Sea also caused Axum to suffer economically and it declined in power. Axum's final three centuries are considered a dark age, in which Ethiopian Greek culture disappeared; the Axumite Empire finally collapsed around 960 AD. Despite its position as one of the foremost empires of late antiquity, Axum fell into obscurity as Ethiopia remained isolated throughout the Middle Ages.

=== Abyssinian Greeks ===
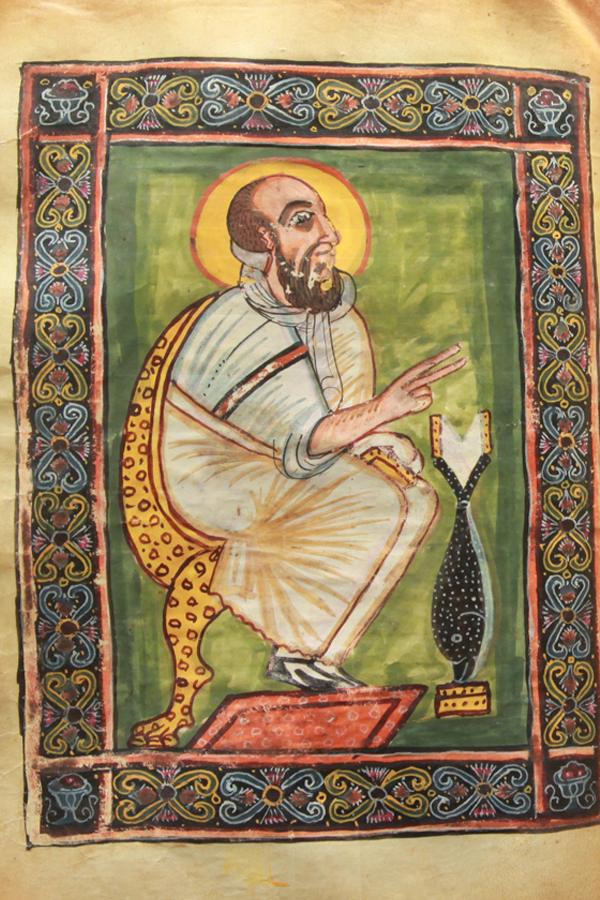
An illuminated Evangelist portrait of Saint Mark, from the Garima Gospels, 6th century, Kingdom of Aksum, influenced by Byzantine art

Later Abyssinian Greeks were attested in the 1700s, largely descending from Greek craftsmen and sailors residing in Abyssinia, who facilitated commerce between Abyssinia and Europe. The explorer James Bruce reported that a number of Greek refugees from Smyrna had also arrived in Gondar during the reign of Emperor Iyasu II. The Smyrniot refugees included twelve silversmiths, whom the emperor put to work producing a variety of items for both his court and the churches of Gondar.

Abyssinian Greeks held many of the highest positions in the Abyssinian Empire; the principal Abyssinian Greek community stayed with the Abyssinian Emperor in the capital, Gondar. Emperor Theodore II specifically made known that he favored the Abyssinian Greeks, because of their virility and integrity of character.

== Ancient Libya ==
=== Libyan Greeks of Cyrenaica ===
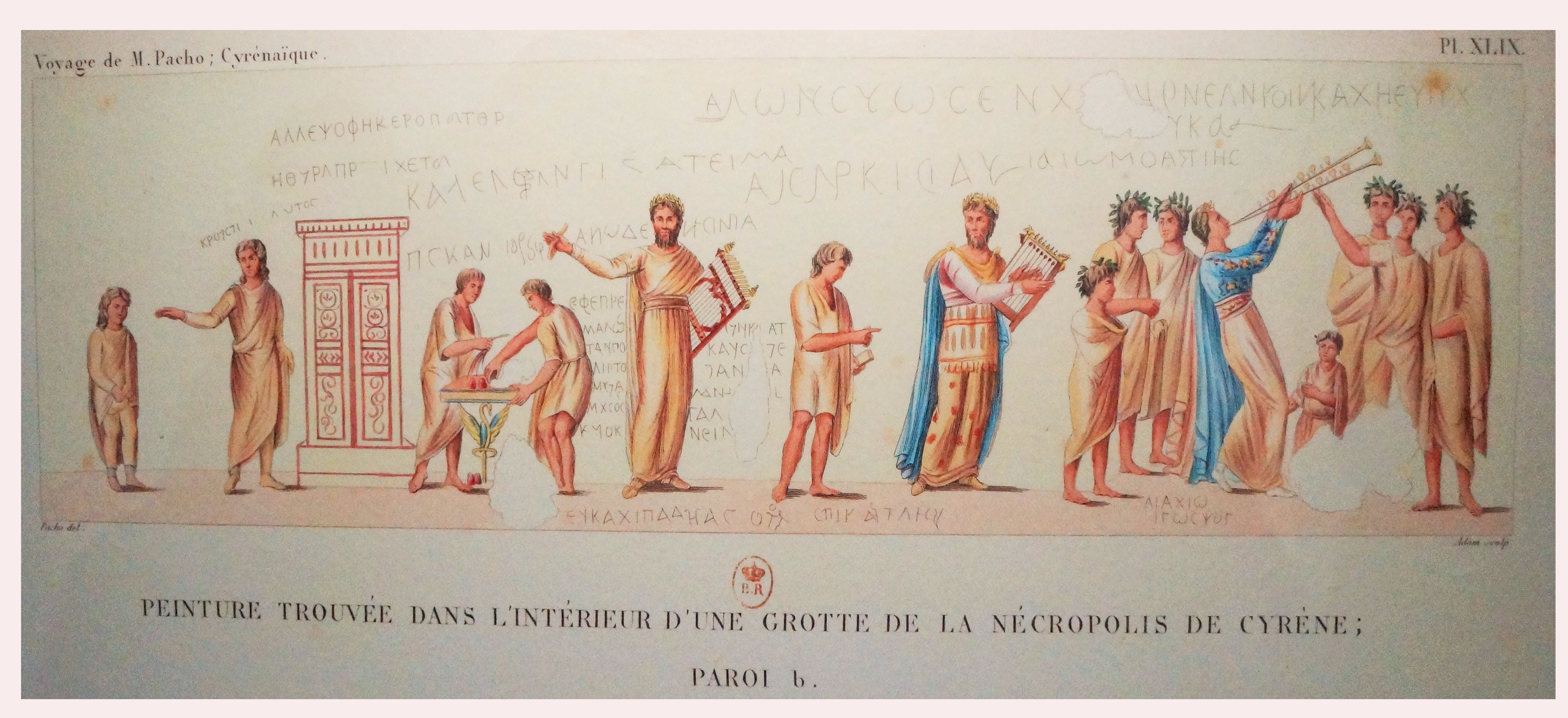
Libyan Greeks of Cyrenaica.

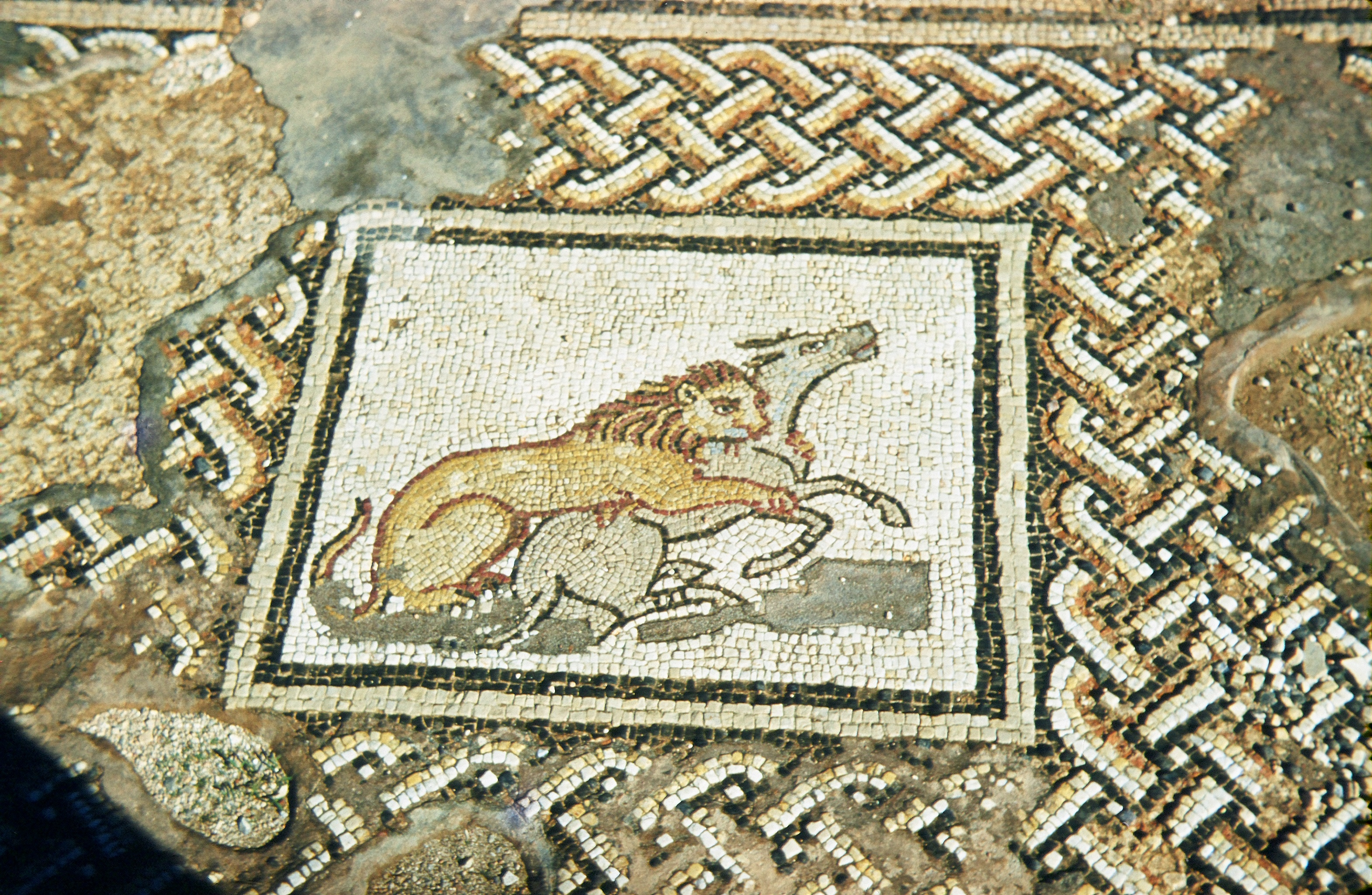
A Libyan Greek fresco in Ptolemais, Cyrenaica.

Cyrenaica was colonized by Greeks beginning in the 7th century BC. The first and most important colony was that of Cyrene, established in about 631 BC by colonists from the Greek island of Thera, which they had abandoned because of a severe famine. Their commander, Aristoteles, took the Libyan name Battos. His descendants, known as the Battiad dynasty, persisted in spite of severe conflict with Greeks in neighboring cities.

The eastern portion of the province, with no major population centers, was called Marmarica; the more important western portion was known as the Pentapolis, as it comprised five cities: Cyrene (near the modern village of Shahat) with its port of Apollonia (Marsa Susa), Arsinoe or Taucheira (Tocra), Euesperides or Berenice (near modern Benghazi), Balagrae (Bayda) and Barce (Marj) – of which the chief was the eponymous Cyrene. The term "Pentapolis" continued to be used as a synonym for Cyrenaica. In the south, the Pentapolis faded into the Saharan tribal areas, including the pharaonic oracle of Ammonium.

The region produced barley, wheat, olive oil, wine, figs, apples, wool, sheep, cattle and silphium, a herb that grew only in Cyrenaica and was regarded as a medicinal cure and aphrodisiac. Cyrene became one of the greatest intellectual and artistic centers of the Greek world, famous for its medical school, learned academies and architecture, which included some of the finest examples of the Hellenistic style. The Cyrenaics, a school of thinkers who expounded a doctrine of moral cheerfulness that defined happiness as the sum of human pleasures, were founded by Aristippus of Cyrene. Other notable natives of Cyrene were the poet Callimachus and the mathematicians Theodorus and Eratosthenes.

=== Libyan Greek culture ===
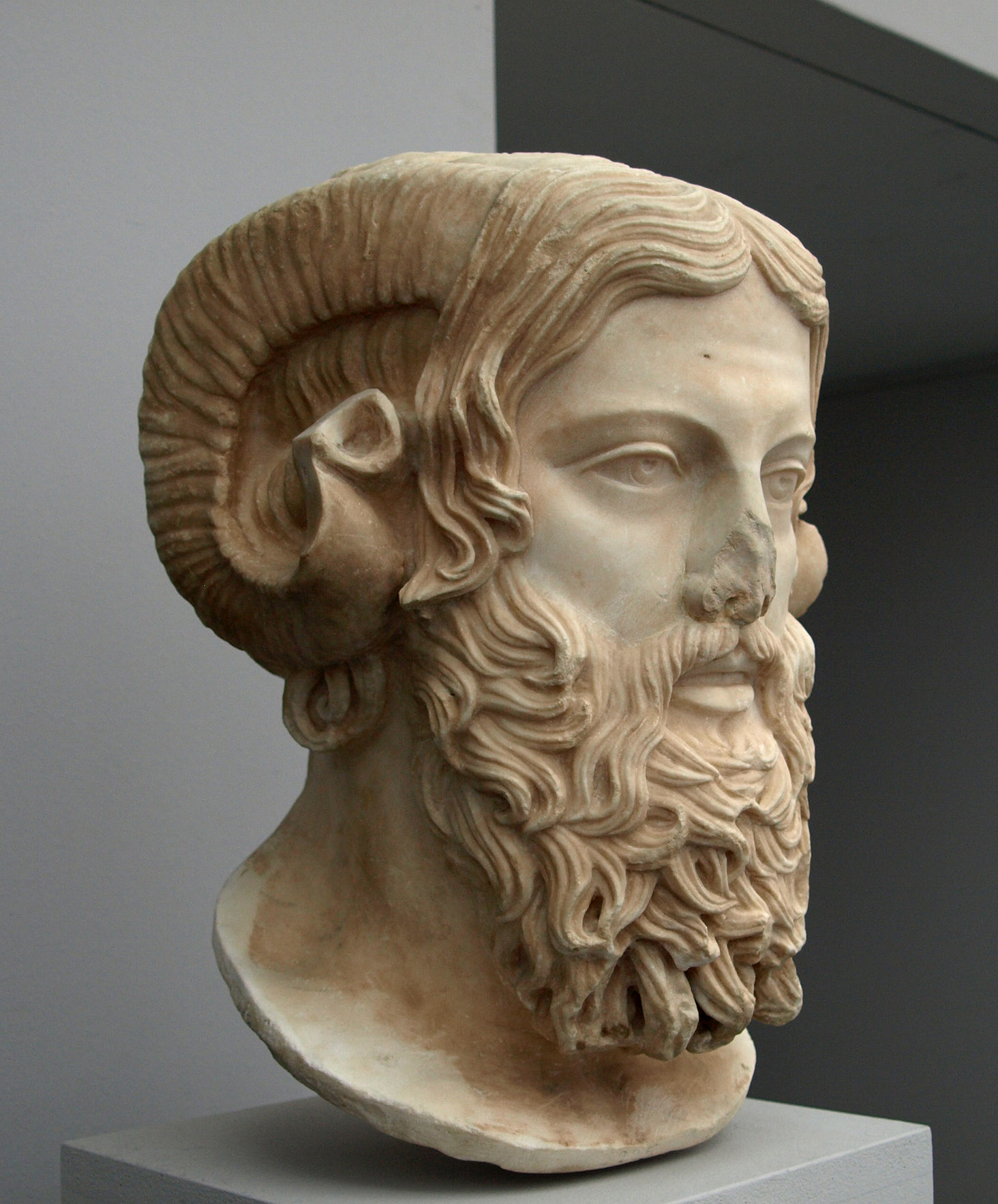
The Libyan Greek god, Ammon.

The most influential of the Libyan Greeks were the Cyreneans. The Cyreneans invited Greek colonists from all over the Greek world to settle in Cyrene.

The Cyrenean government was originally an absolute monarchy, but under Demonax, it became a constitutional monarchy with a senate. Demonax divided the Cyreneans into three groups to elect senators: first, the original Theran colonists and ethnic Libyans, second, Peloponnesians and Cretans, and third, Aegean islanders. Under the Cyrenean constitution, the king only had the authority to grant land to citizens, and held the role of chief priest, in charge of religious duties.

Libyan Greek religion was directly influenced by Ancient Egyptian religion. The Cyreneans assimilated the Egyptian god Amun with Zeus as "Ammon", embodying Zeus in his style and Amun in his nature, attributing the horns of a ram to his image.

Ammon had a wife, Ammonia, and a son, Parammon (Thoth-Hermes), considered Ammon's hypostasis (incarnation). Parammon was also the secretary of Osiris, one of the sons of Ammon.

== Ancient Nubia ==
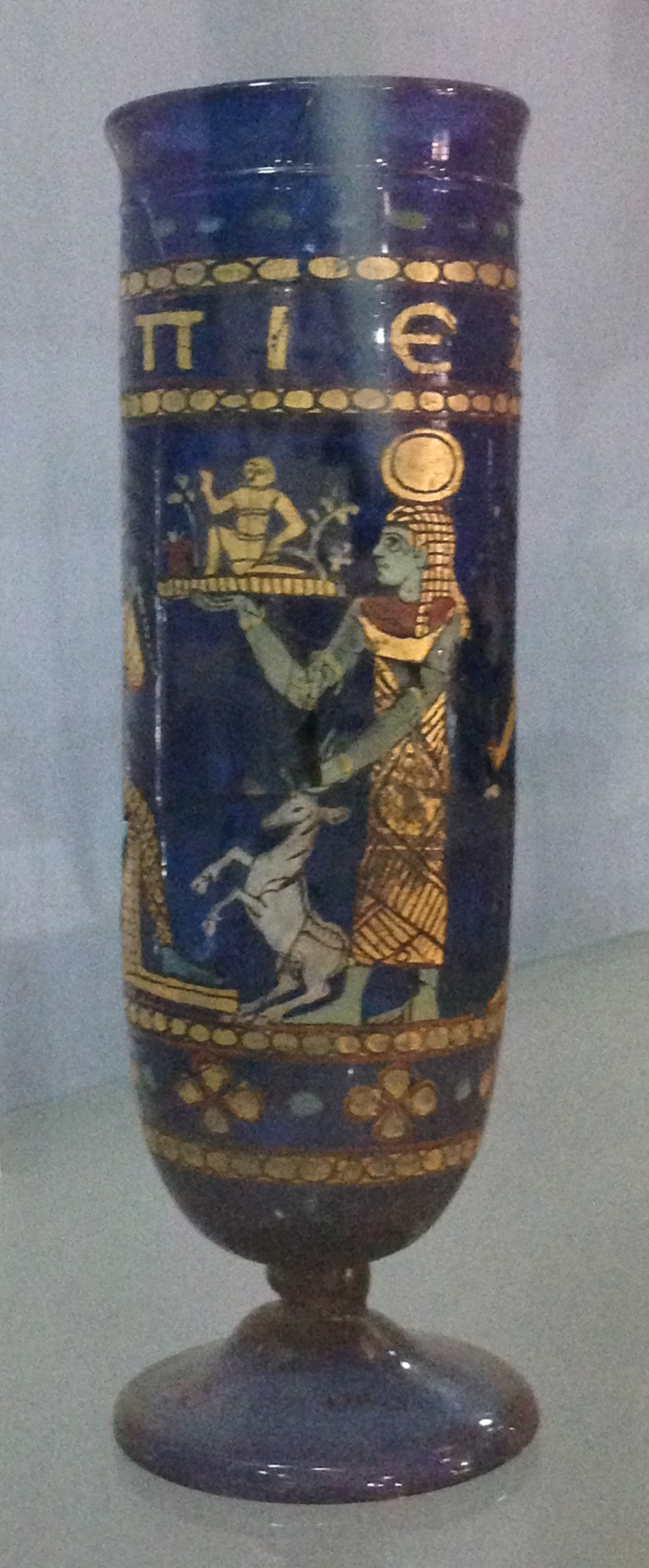
Polychromatic, gilded glass vase of Meroitic manufacture excavated in Sedeinga, on display at the National Museum of Sudan. The Greek letters read "Drink and you shall live"

Intercultural exchange between the Hellenic and Nubian civilizations started at least two and a half millennia ago. The Greek presence in the Nile Valley and its considerable impact on ancient Nubia have long been recognized by scholars. The first recorded contact took place in 593 BC: graffiti at Abu Simbel reveal that large numbers of Greek mercenaries served under Psamtik II in his invasion of what is now Sudan.

Vice versa, ancient Nubia also had an influence on Greek culture from those early times onwards, as it was well known by scholars throughout the Hellenic world, where several of the classical writers mentioned it. It evidently inspired curiosity about the exotic lands South of Egypt and particularly about the sources of the Nile river. Hence, the pioneering historian Herodotus (circa 484 – circa 425 BC) made references to Nubia as a land of "burned faces" (Ethiopians) and the source of the Nile. Though he is assumed to have been personally familiar with the river only as far as Aswan, he did identify a "city of Ethiopians" at Meroë, apparently from reports by Psamtik II and Cambyses II.

A new era of Greek-Nubian relations began in 332 BC, when Alexander the Great conquered Egypt and soon dispatched reconnaissance expeditions into Nubia, possibly to find the sources of the Nile. Scholars assume that the potential Ptolemaic threat contributed to the decision by the Kushitic king Nastasen to move the capital from Napata to Meroë. Greek language and culture were introduced to the Kushitic ruling classes, which may have triggered the creation of an alphabetic Meroitic writing. Hellenic influences are also evident from changes in art styles.

Nubian contact with the Greek world remained sporadic until Ptolemy II's Nubian campaign for Meroë in the 270s BC. Ptolemy's interest in Nubia was to secure a source of war elephants from Meroë, and to gain access to Meroitic gold mines. At the same time, Ergamenes (Arkamani II), a king of one of the nine Nubian kingdoms, studied Greek language and customs at the Alexandrian court in the Ptolemaic Empire.

Eratosthenes (circa 276–194 BC), the Greek geographer and librarian at Alexandria, sketched "with fair accuracy" the course of the Nile as far south as what is now Khartoum, based on the accounts of various travellers. Pliny listed a number of Greeks who had travelled to Meroë and sometimes beyond: Dalion, Aristocreon, Bion, Basilis, and Simonides the Younger, who apparently lived at Meroe for five years.

Relations between Kush and Ptolemaic Egypt thereafter remained tense, but stable. By the time of Ptolemy VIII (170-163 BC), Greek ships regularly sailed on the Red Sea and to Meroitic ports. The Nubian upper class traded with Greek merchants and adopted certain Hellenic styles of life. However, following the death of Cleopatra VII in 30 BC and an unsuccessful attempt by the Romans to conquer the kingdom, Greek influences withered in Nubia. The account of Strabo, the geographer and historian of Greek descent, in his Geographia is one of the last references to Nubia from that time.

=== Axumite subjugation of Nubia ===
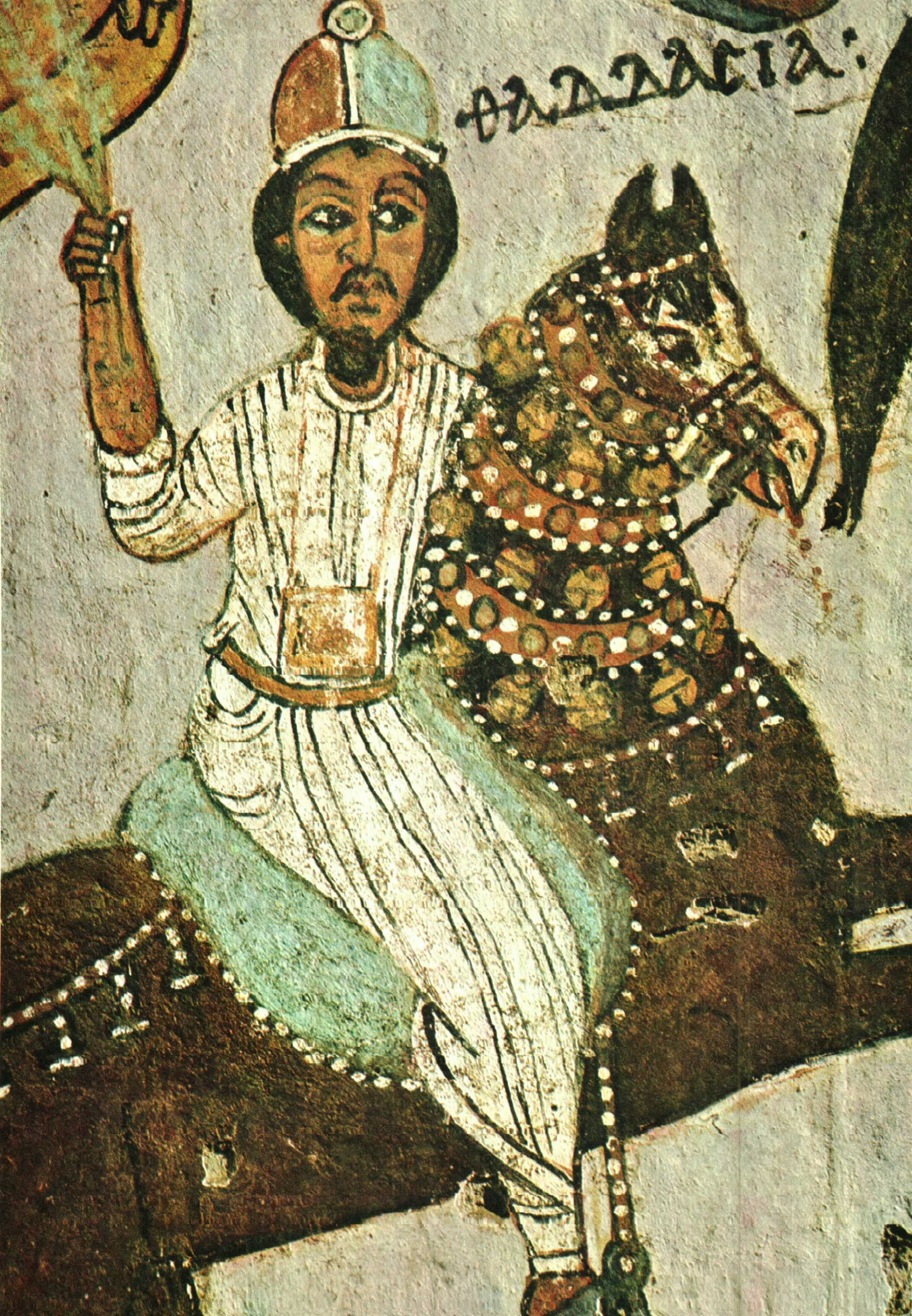
A Nubian Greek fresco in Faras

The Axumite Empire engaged in a series of invasions that culminated in the capture of the Nubian capital of Meroë in the middle of the 4th century AD, signaling the end of independent Nubian Pagan kingdoms. The Axumites then converted the Nubians to Christianity, establishing the authority of the Coptic Church in the area, and founded new Nubian Christian kingdoms, such as Nobatia, Alodia, and Makuria.

Tribal nomads like the Beja, Afar, and Saho managed to remain autonomous due to their uncentralized nomadic nature. These tribal peoples would sporadically inflict attacks and raids on Axumite communities. The Beja nomads eventually Hellenized and integrated into the Nubian Greek society that had already been present in Lower Nubia for three centuries.

=== Nubian Greeks ===
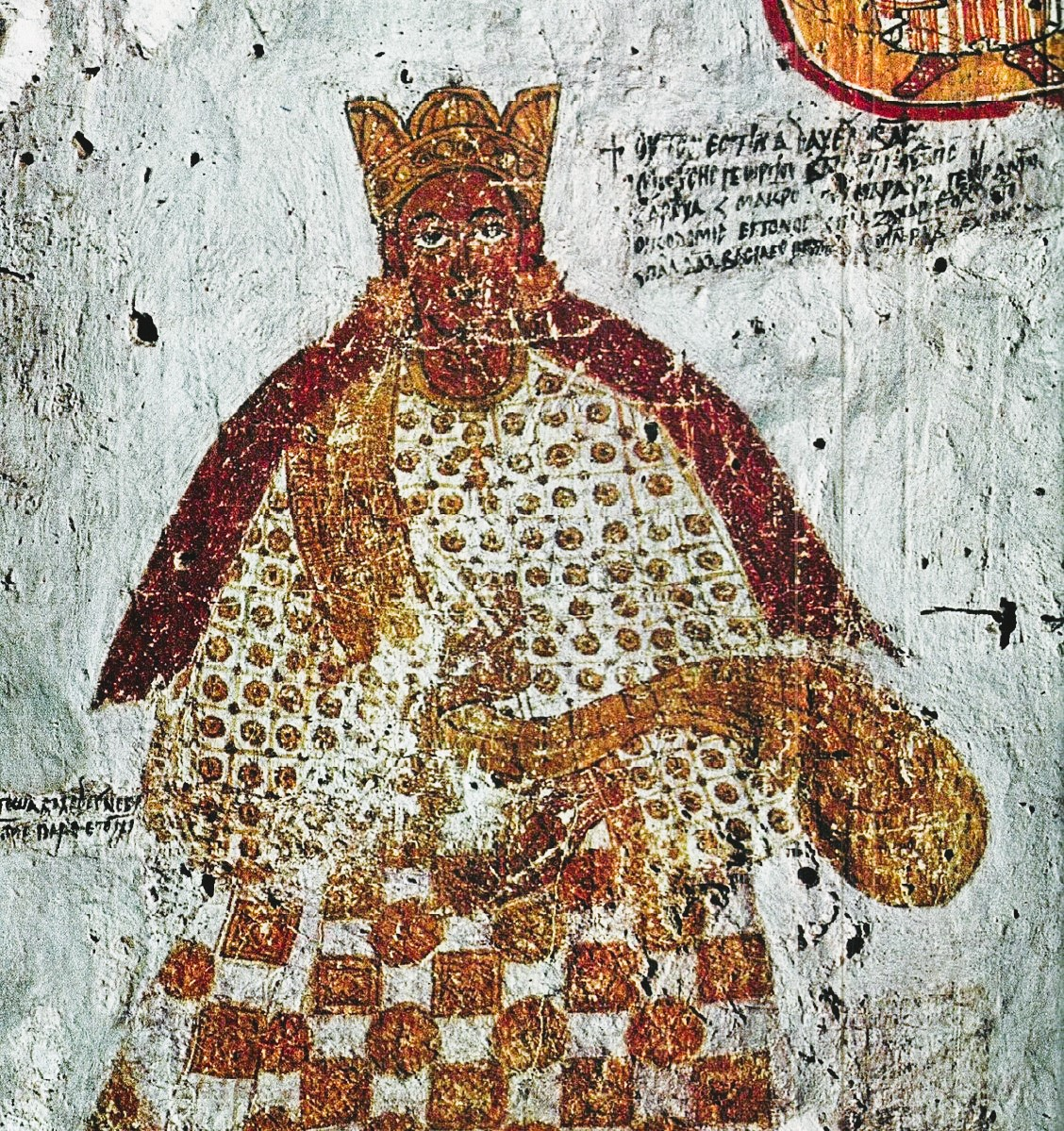
King Moses Georgios of Makuria

Nubian Greek culture followed the pattern of Egyptian Greek and Byzantine Greek civilization, expressed in Nubian Greek art and Nubian Greek literature. The earliest attestations of Nubian Greek literature come from the 5th century; the Nubian Greek language resembles Egyptian and Byzantine Greek; it served as a lingua franca throughout the Nubian Kingdoms, and had a creolized form for trade among the different peoples in Nubia.

Nubian Greek was unique in that it adopted many words from both Coptic Egyptian and Nubian; Nubian Greek's syntax also evolved to establish a fixed word order.

The following is an example of Nubian Greek language:

ⲟⲩⲧⲟⲥ ⲉⲥⲧⲓⲛ ⲁⲇⲁⲩⲉⲗ ⲃⲁⲥⲓⲗⲉⲩ ⲙⲱⲥⲉⲥ ⲅⲉⲱⲣⲅⲓⲟⲩ, ⲃⲁⲥⲓⲗⲉⲩ ⲛⲟⲩⲃⲇⲏⲥ, ⲁⲣⲟⲩⲁ, ⲙⲁⲕⲣⲟ

Οὗτός ἐστιν ἀδαύελ Βασιλεύ Μώσες Γεωργίου, Βασιλεύ Νουβδῆς, Ἀρουά, Μακρό

This is the great King Moses Georgios, the King of Nobatia, Alodia, Makuria

A plethora of frescoes created between 800–1200 AD in Nubian cities such as Faras depicted religious life in the courts of the Nubian Kingdoms; they were made in Byzantine art style.

Nubian Greek titles and government styles in Nubian Kingdoms were based on Byzantine models; even with Islamic encroachments and influence into Nubian territory, the Nubian Greeks saw Constantinople as their spiritual home. Nubian Greek culture disappeared after the Muslim conquest of Nubia around 1450 AD.
