= Monumentum Adulitanum =

Ancient inscription in Ge'ez and Greek from Eritrea

The Monumentum Adulitanum II, so named by Leo Allatius, was an ancient inscription written in Greek, depicting the military campaigns of an anonymous king. The original text was inscribed on a throne in Adulis. Although the inscription has never been discovered by archaeologists, it is known about through the copying of the inscription by Cosmas Indicopleustes, a 6th-century Greek traveler-monk. The text narrates the king's military campaigns in the African continent and in the Arabian peninsula. It is thought to be between 200 and 270 AD.

== Text ==
The following is a translation of Monumentum Adulitanum II by Laurence P. Kirwan:

and after this, having become strong and having commanded those nearest the kingdom to keep the peace, I waged war on the following peoples: I made war on the Gaze, then, having conquered Agame and Sigyene, I seized half their property and peoples. Aua, Zingabene, Aggabe, Tiamaa, Athagous, Kalaa and the people of Samen who live across the Nile in inaccessible and snowbound mountains where storms and icy cold persist and the snowfall is so deep that a man sinks in it up to the knees; I subdued them after crossing the river. Then Lasine, Zaa, and Gabala; they dwell on a mountain where hot springs flow. Having subjected the Atalmo, the Bega, and with them all the Taggaite peoples who occupy territories leading to the frontiers of Egypt, I had a road constructed going from the lands of my empire to Egypt. Then I overcame the Annine and the Metine who live among precipitous mountains.

I fought against the Sesea who entrenched themselves on a very high and very inaccessible mountain; I surrounded them and forced them to come down and I seized for myself their young, women, children, virgins, and all their belongings. I subdued the Rauso who live in the midst of vast, waterless plains in the heart of a barbarous country, rich in incense; and the Solate whom I ordered to watch over the coasts of the sea.

All these peoples, defended by mighty mountains, I conquered them and compelled them to submit, taking part myself in the campaign, and I allowed them to keep their land in return for tribute. Most of the others, meanwhile, surrendered and pay tribute of their own free will. In the same way, after I had sent a fleet and an army against the Arabites and the Kinaidokolpites who live across the Red Sea and forced their kings to submit, I commanded them to pay tribute for their land and to keep the peace by land and sea and I waged war from Leuke Come to the land of the Sabaeans.

I am the first and the only one of my line to have rendered subject all these peoples and for this I give thanks to the greatest of my gods, to Ares who begat me and who has enabled me to extend my sway over all those neighboring my country, to the east as far as the Land of Incense, to the west as far as the regions of Ethiopia and Sasu, conquering some myself in person, sending my armies against others. And having brought peace to the whole world under my dominion, I have returned to Adulis to offer sacrifices to Zeus and Ares, and also to Poseidon for the safety of those who sail on the sea. After mustering my armies and uniting them, I have come here and dedicated this throne to Ares in the 27th year of my reign.

== Interpretation ==
The inscription mentions many different groups of people and locations. Some can be identified without difficulty, like the Beja who are well known to have been in western Eritrea. The mention of "streams of hot water" implies a nearby location with geothermal springs. While there are several such springs in central Ethiopia, those closest to Aksum are found in the Afar region. It is possible that the Gabala are to be identified with the Gabala tribe of the upper Awash mentioned in the chronicles of Amda Seyon. The Awash Basin has numerous geothermal springs, so placing Gabala in this area would align with the presence of hot waters. Atalmo and Tangaites are not known from any source apart from Monumentum Adulitanum. The Byzantine ambassador Nonnosus, in his visit to the kingdom, mentions "Aua" as positioned midway between Aksum and Adulis. It can possibly be identified as Adwa. "Ethiopia" refers to Nubia, which the Graeco-Roman world knew as "Ethiopia." The Aksumites appropriated the name "Ethiopians" for themselves during the reign of Ezana of Axum not long after. The 3rd century inscription also contains what may be the first reference to the Agaw, referring to a people called "Athagaus" (perhaps from ʿAd Agäw).

The inscription also notes that in the unnamed King's expedition to the mountains past the Nile, his men were knee-deep in snow. This has been postulated as the Simien Mountains. The Simiens are remarkable as being one of the few spots in tropical Africa where snow regularly falls. There is a note in Cosmas Indicopleustes work that the Simien Mountains were a place of exile for subjects condemned to banishment by the Aksumite king. The other campaigns alluded to are thought to have been largely directed at the lowlands and coastal regions south of Adulis and possibly as far as northern Somalia. Although it is thought by some that any territorial claim over this region would be far fetched. According to Kirwan, this would not fit geographically, as the incense land described in the inscription lay to the east, more likely referencing Hadramawt. From ancient times Somalia had been renowned, together with Hadramawt and Dhofar in South Arabia, for its production of frankincense.

Lastly, the inscription mentions conquests in the Arabian Peninsula against the Kinaidokolpites and Arabites. The "Arabites" can safely be equated with the coastal bedouins, while the Kinaidokolpitai were a tribe whose name already appears in Ptolemy's Geography in the 2nd century, and are believed to be the Kinana.

The inscription concludes with the King's affirmation that he is the first to have subjugated all of the aforementioned peoples and dedicates his throne to Zeus (or the god Astar, cognate to the Semitic goddess Astarte), as well as to the god Poseidon, associated with Beher, and finally to Ares, equated to Mahrem.

Seeing that the text was in Greek and followed an inscription about King Ptolemy III Euergetes's conquests in Asia, Cosmas Indicopleustes mistook the Aksumite inscription for the continuation of Ptolemy's. The Ptolemaic portion of the text is referred to as Monumentum Adulitanum

The identity of this king has been a point of contention for many years, with some suggesting that he was not an Aksumite king but rather a Himyarite king, although this assertion has never been successful. The beginning of the inscription was damaged before being recorded by Cosmas. Glen Bowersock proposes that it might have been Gadarat or Sembrouthes. Yuzo Shitomi suggests it was ʽDhBH [vocalized ʽAḏbeha or ʽAṣbeḥā].

== Significance ==
The composition of the inscriptions in Greek signals the major role played by Hellenization in the region of modern-day Ethiopia & Eritrea in ancient times, including how the Aksumite king who wrote Monumentum Adulitanum II appears to have attempted to mimic the language of the earlier inscription by Ptolemy III. In addition, Monumentum Adulitanum II contains the earliest surviving evidence for Aksumite conquests, and is partially corroborated in this by a Greek inscription found at Aksum (RIE 269). . Testimony to the substantial growth of the Kingdom of Aksum during this period comes from the founder of Manichaeism, Mani (c. 216–277 CE). In a passage from Kephalaia (a collection of his teachings), Mani stated that there were four great kingdoms in the world . After the "Kingdom of the land of Babylon and of Persia" and the "Kingdom of the Romans," he listed the "Kingdom of the Aksumites" as the third. Scholars debate the identity of the fourth kingdom, referred to as the "Kingdom of Silis," though many identify it with China. Since Mani was based within the Sasanian Empire, his recognition of Aksum's status suggests that by the mid-to-late 3rd century the kingdom had expanded significantly beyond its traditional highland core.

== See also ==
- Ethiopian historiography
