= Ethiopian Greeks =

Greek community in Ethiopia

የኢትዮጵያ ግሪኮች Έλληνες της Αιθιοπίας

Total population
- c. 500

Regions with significant populations
- Addis Ababa, Dire Dawa

Languages
- Amharic, Greek, English.

Religion
- Greek Orthodox Church

Related ethnic groups
- African Greeks · Egyptian Greeks, Sudanese Greeks

Ethiopian Greeks, or Greeks in Ethiopia, are ethnic Greeks from Ethiopia. Today they number about 500 persons and can be traced back to ancient history. They are mainly located in the capital, Addis Ababa, and the city of Dire Dawa.

== History ==
The name Ethiopia itself is Greek and could be interpreted as either "burnt face " or "of radiating appearance". It is first attested in the Homeric epics but it is unlikely to have referred to any particular nation, but rather, to people of African descent in general.

Beginning in the Hellenistic age around the third century BC, Greek culture permeated the regions of ancient Ethiopia. Greeks established colonies in Ethiopia, with Ptolemais Theron and Axum becoming major capitals of Ethiopian Greek culture. In the second century BC, Ptolemy III Euergetes annexed several northern Ethiopian cities such as Tigray and the port of Adulis, which became major trading hubs for Ethiopian Greeks.

=== Axumites of Ethiopia ===
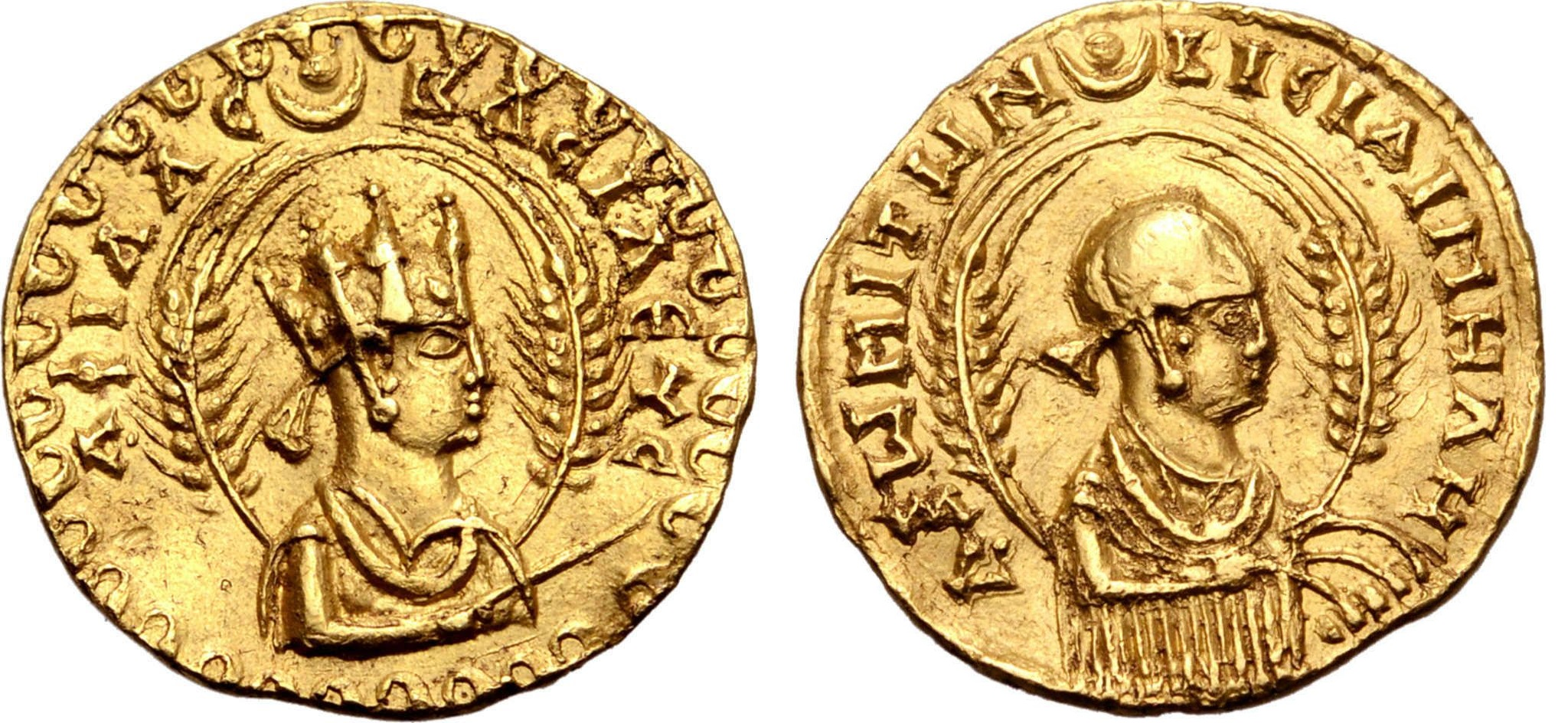
Axumite coinage that reads "AΦIΛAC BACIΛEYC" – "King Aphilas"

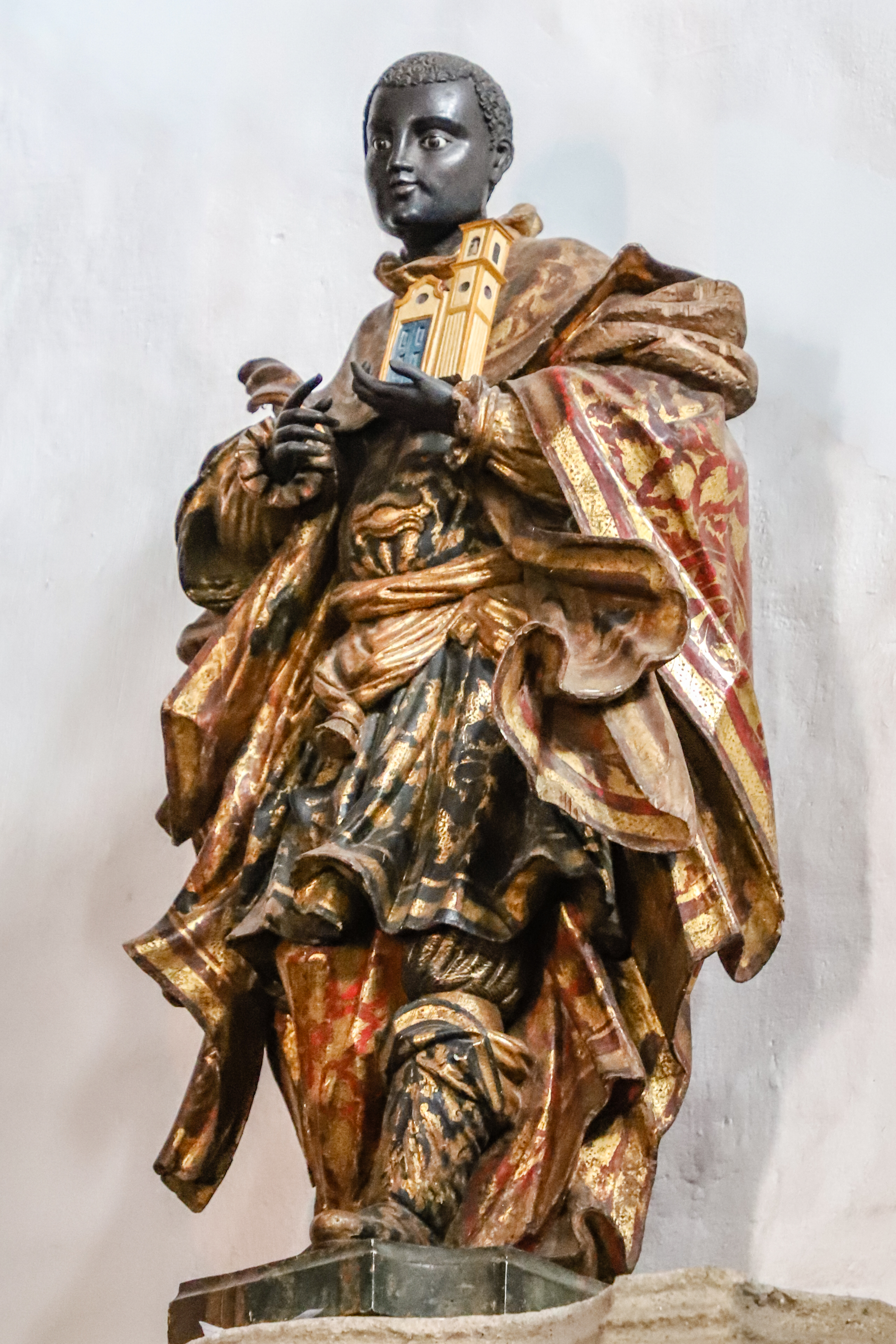
Saint Elesbaan, King of Axum

After the Romans annexed the Ptolemaic Empire, the Axumite king Zoskales (Ancient Greek: Ζωσκάλης) established the Axumite Empire (Ancient Greek: Ἀξωμίτης) (c. 100 AD–c. 960 AD), which maintained Ethiopian Greek culture and used Greek as its lingua franca. In the city of Axum, many obelisks, statues, and architecture made in Egyptian Greek style still mark the landscape.

As the Islamic conquest of North Africa severed Axum's link with the Greek world in the seventh century, Greek culture and knowledge waned; Muslim presence in the Red Sea also caused Axum to suffer economically and it declined in power. Axum's final three centuries are considered a dark age, in which Ethiopian Greek culture disappeared; the Axumite Empire finally collapsed around 960 AD. Despite its position as one of the foremost empires of late antiquity, Axum fell into obscurity as Ethiopia remained isolated throughout the Middle Ages.

=== Abyssinian Greeks ===
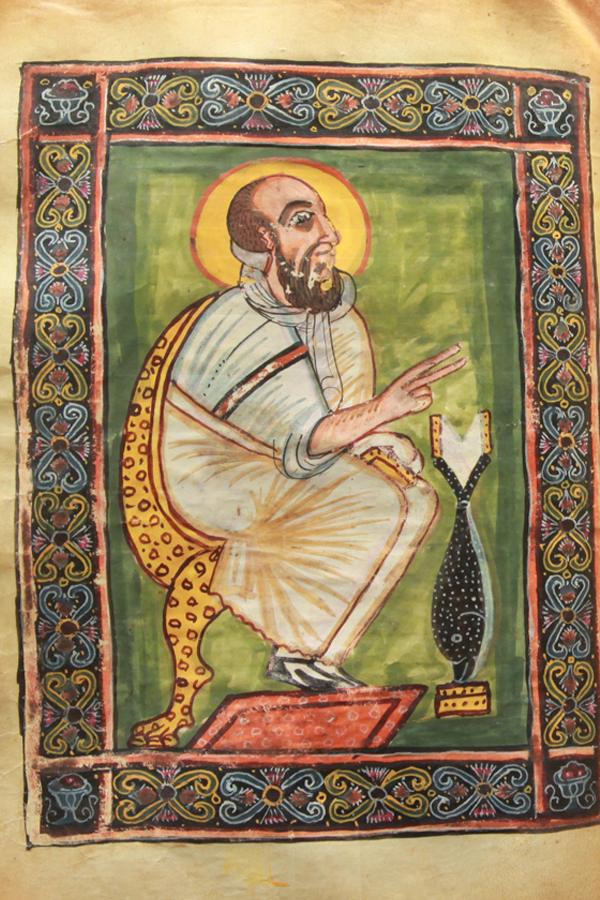
An illuminated Evangelist portrait of Saint Mark, from the Garima Gospels, 6th century, Kingdom of Aksum, influenced by Byzantine art

Later Abyssinian Greeks were attested in the 1700s, largely descending from Greek craftsmen and sailors residing in Abyssinia, who facilitated commerce between Abyssinia and Europe. The explorer James Bruce reported that a number of Greek refugees from Smyrna had also arrived in Gondar during the reign of Emperor Iyasu II. The Smyrniot refugees included twelve silversmiths, whom the emperor put to work producing a variety of items for both his court and the churches of Gondar.

Abyssinian Greeks held many of the highest positions in the Abyssinian Empire; the principal Abyssinian Greek community stayed with the Abyssinian Emperor in the capital, Gondar. Emperor Theodore II specifically made known that he favored the Abyssinian Greeks, because of their virility and integrity of character.

=== Modern Ethiopian Greeks ===
The heyday of the Ethiopian Greek community was in the early part of the 20th century with the establishment of the Holy Metropolis of Axum by the Patriarchate of Alexandria in 1908 and of the Greek organizations in Addis Ababa (1918) and Dire Dawa (1921).

In 1969, an Association of Ethio Hellenic Studies was formed. The Founder President of the Association was Greek Metropolitan Methodios Fouyas of Aksum and the Vice presidents were V.C. Samuel, Dean of the Faculty of Theology and P. Petrides of the French Academy of Science. L.S. Babte Mariam Workeneh was the Secretary General, and Nicolas Geoprgkas, President of the Greek Community in Addis Ababa was the Treasurer. Merid Asfa Wossen, Crown Prince of Ethiopia, was the Patron, and Archbishop Theophilos of Harar and Acting Patriarch of Ethiopia was the Chairman. To promote the scholarly works concerning Ethiopia and Greece and their historical and ecclesiastical heritage and achievements the Year Book ABBA SLAMA was published from 1970 to 1976.

In the post-war period the community grew to 3,000 persons. It suffered during the revolution that overthrew Haile Selassie in 1974, when the hostility of the Derg towards all foreign communities drastically reduced its size to the current population of about 500.

As of 2025 there is still a Greek school in the capital and a Greek Orthodox church in the same city (St. Froumendios). The school has about 120 students, many of whom receive scholarships to continue their studies in Greece. However there is an increasing initiative by Greeks to take advantage of the investment opportunities currently available in Ethiopia.

== See also ==
- Ethiopia–Greece relations
- Greek diaspora
- Demographics of Ethiopia
