= Sembrouthes =

Sembroutheios
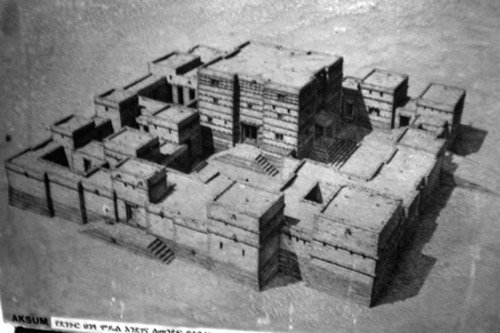

King of Aksum
- Reign: c.240-260
- Predecessor: ʽDBH
- Successor: DTWNS

Sembrouthes was a King of the Kingdom of Aksum who most likely reigned sometime in the 3rd century. He is known only from a single inscription in Greek that was found at Dekemhare (ደቀምሓረ ድንበዛን), Hamasien in modern-day Eritrea, which is dated to his 24th regnal year. Sembrouthes was the first known ruler in the lands later ruled by the Emperor of Ethiopia to adopt the title "King of Kings". He is a probable candidate for the king who erected the Monumentum Adulitanum.

His inscription reads as:

"King of kings of Aksum, great Sembrouthes came (and) dedicated (this inscription) in the year 24 of Sembrouthes the Great King"

Discussing the evidence provided in the inscription and the absence of any coins issued with his name of them, Munro-Hay concludes that Sembrouthes "finds better into the earlier part of the Aksumite royal sequence. In his later history of Aksum, Munro-Hay narrowed the date of his reign to a gap between `DBH and DTWNS, or c.250. However, W.R.O. Hahn, in a study published in 1983, assigns Sembrouthes to the 4th century, between Aphilas and Ezana. Hahn further identifies him with Ousanas or the legendary Ella Amida.

== Notes ==
Regnal titles
| Preceded by `DBH (uncertain) | King of Axum | Succeeded by DTWNS (uncertain) |
