= Himyarite-Axumite war of 270-272 =

Himyarite-Axumite conflict of 270-272
Date	270-272
Location	Yemen
Result	Himyarite victory
Territorial changes	The collapse of the alliance against the Himyarite kingdom and the exposure of all kingdoms to colonization at the hands of the Himyarites

Belligerents
Himyar; Khawlan	Kingdom of Hadhramaut kingdom of Qataban; Kingdom of Sheba; Madhhij; Sirwah; Axum; Ma’afir tribe Kindah

Commanders and leaders
Yasser Yahanʿam; Khāʾ tˤin awkn	DTWNS; ZQRNS

Strength
Unknown.	Unknown.

Between 270-272 AD, Yasir Yahnum took advantage of the absence of conflict between the Raydan (Royal house of Himyar) and the Sabaeans, directing all his efforts towards eliminating the Abyssinians and their supporters. This came in the wake of the emergence of the Abyssinian kings DTWNS and his son ZQRNS, who led a military campaign supported by their allies from Dhū Maʿāfir and Suhār, managing to breach himyar’s territory. Their forces and supporters reached Wadi Khabān, located south of the capital Zafar Yarim. To protect his kingdom from this growing assault, orders were issued by Yasir Yahnum to his leader Khatin Awkan, the commander who was entrusted with repelling the Abyssinian advance. He camped with his tribe and the Himyarites in opposition to the Abyssinian troops.

The commander Khatin Awkan recalls numerous fierce battles fought against the armies of the Abyssinian kings DTWNS and ZQRNS in the area of Aden port and its surroundings. Through effective organization and strong determination, the Himyarites were able to defeat their enemies in these battles, and their effective strategies led them to expel the Abyssinians towards the Red sea.

This campaign against the Abyssinians stands as evidence of Yasir Yahnum's prowess as a military leader and his ability to exploit political circumstances to his advantage. His victories were not only the result of combat engagements but also reflected a broad vision of military strategy and keen insight into the happenings in the region.

== Background ==
According to historian and writer Stuart Munro-Hay, Himyar was growing in power in that period after a series of campaigns against Saba and Axum in which they repelled them and grew in power. To curb this, the Axumite king DTWNS and his son ZQRNS decided to wage war against Himyar from 267 to 268 AD in which they reached Wadi Khaban at the reign of king Yasser Yahanʿam.

The inscription starts by detailed account of the incursion set by DTWNS and his son ZQRNS who were rulers of Abyssinia went forth. Their intent to Take Action of a growing Himyarite power in south Arabia After multiple wars and campaigns against the reign of Saba.

DTWNS and his son ZQRNS and their ally the tribe of ma’afir made a breakthrough into Himyarite boundaries reaching even the southern gates of the Himyarite capital Zafar Yarim in Wadi Khaban triggering the war.

== The conflict ==
The conflict started when the rulers of Abyssinia, namely DTWNS and his son ZQRNS, with their allies Al Ma’afar and Sahra, undertook a moderate scale invasion of Himyar. They managed to go further into the region and reached Wadi Khaban, lying south of Zafar Yarim, which was the capital city at the time. Yasser Yahan'am being the leader of Himyar then commanded his leader Khāʾ tˤin awkn to initiate an offensive against Axumites covering the wide area of south Arabia.

During the tenure of three months, skirmishes between both the armies took place and neither were able to dominate the other. At some point after three months of arrow exchange, the Axumite forces fled to Wadi Bana and got pursued by the Himyarites which led to a violent confrontation. In this battle, the Himyarite forces overcame and forced the deficient Abyssinian forces back into their quarters. After this victory, Yasser Yahan'am decided to elevate few ranks and make Khāʾ tˤin awkn the Qayl of the stomping grounds of Maqra.

Later on in a series of minor campaigns Khāʾ tˤin awkn besieged the fortresses of "brh" and "mtnh" and the palace of Radman in which he won and took everyone present as prisoner and looted their equipment and goods of the fortresses. Afterwards, they burnt all fortresses, killing and imprisoning amongst them 270 people.

Further conflict and fights between the two sides made the already losing Axumites make considerable losses until they fled to the southern part of himyar Aden in which according to the inscription Himyarites besieged them in a crushing defeat, causing the remaining Axumite force to swim torwards the Barbarian sea (shore of modern day Djibouti).
