= GRMT =

Aksum and South Arabia during the third century.

GRMT (vocalized as Gärma[t] for convenience, possibly Gärima; flourished 3rd century, possibly AD 230–40) was the son of the Aksumite King `DBH, (possibly vocalized as `Azba or `Azeba), described in South Arabian texts as the "son of the nagashi" (wld ngšy^{n}). Like his predecessor BYGT, also called the "son of the najashi" (under GDRT, `DBH's predecessor), it is not known whether the title meant that they were crown princes or simply generals. Early in his father's reign, the wars that had flared up in South Arabia during GDRT's reign were rekindled. Shamir Yuhahmid of dhū Raydān and Himyar requested `ĐBH's help after having lost some power to two allied pretenders to the throne of Saba' and dhū Raydān. `DBH sent GRMT to South Arabia, where two Epigraphic South Arabian inscriptions mention his actions. He was involved in fighting using both Aksumite and Tihama tribes (conquered under GDRT) on the side of Shamir, but was eventually defeated by the Sabaean king `LŠRH YḤḌB.

== Name ==
Like BYGT and GDRT (the latter of whom appears as GDR in Aksumite inscriptions), the final T on GRMT could possibly be peculiar to South Arabian form. Though the vocalization of his name is still uncertain, it is connected to the Ge'ez root g-r-m. The root g-r-m has a few related meanings, such as "terror" (gərämt), "majesty" (gərma), and to be "admirable," "become formidable," or "be frightful" (gärämä), as well as a number of other related and similar meanings. "Gärima," the name of one of the Nine Saints who came to Ethiopia in the 5th-6th centuries AD, is a very possible vocalization for GRMT, as it is relatively close to GRMT's time period.

== See also ==
- Kingdom of Aksum
- GDRT
- Aksumite currency
