= Ethiopia–Greece relations =

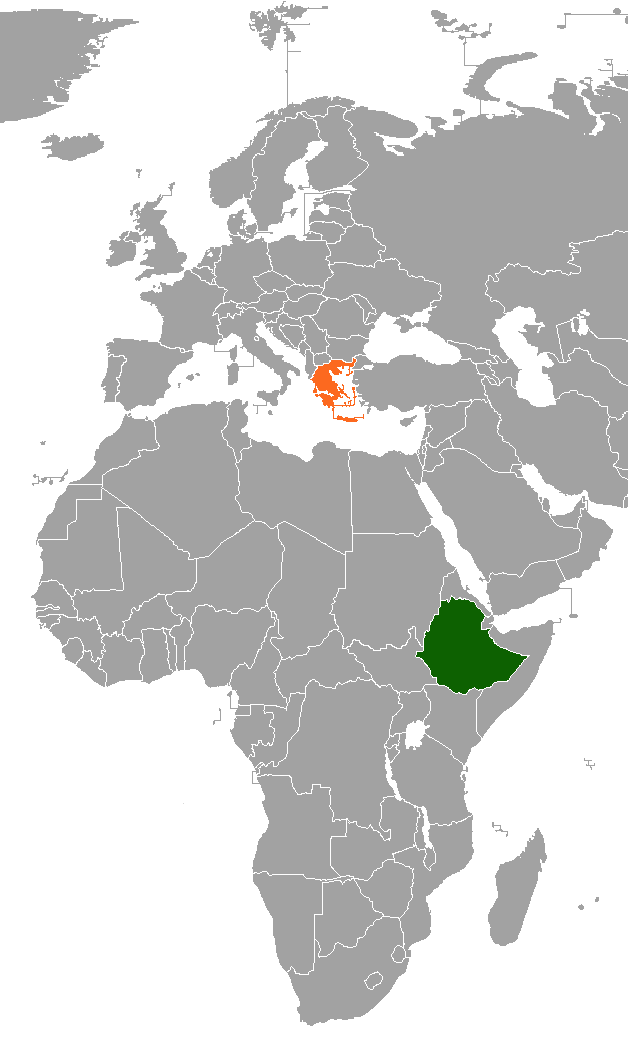

- Ethiopia: Greece

Ethiopia–Greece relations are the international relations between Ethiopia and Greece. In general, bilateral relations between the two countries have been limited, though they have maintained a formal relationship for over a century, including via the signature of several bilateral trade deals.

== History ==
Although the first Greek diplomatic mission in Ethiopia dates to 1917 with the creation of a Greek Consulate, immigrants from Greece have been present in Ethiopia in the service of the Emperor or nobility since at least the mid-18th century. In 1935 the consulate was upgraded to an embassy. From 1951 to 1992, Ethiopia had an embassy in Athens but was forced to close it due to economic reasons. Ethiopia reopened its embassy in Athens on 20 June 2006 when Ambassador of Ethiopia to Greece Mengistu Huluka has presented his letter of credence to Hellenic Republic President Karlos Papulias.Its Embassy was closed on 31 October 2010.

Although the two countries signed trade agreements in 1933, 1955, and 1959, the volume of trade between them remains very low. The Greek Minister of Foreign Affairs, Theodoros Pangalos, made a formal visit to Ethiopia in 1998. The nationalization of properties owned by Greek nationals in Ethiopia during the Derg regime is a factor in the relationship between the two countries.

During the COVID-19 pandemic, Greece donated more than 1.3 million vaccines to Ethiopia.

== Trade ==
All imports from Ethiopia to Greece are duty-free and quota-free, with the exception of armaments, as part of the Everything but Arms initiative of the European Union.

== Diplomatic missions ==
- Ethiopia is accredited to Greece from its embassy in Rome, Italy.
- Greece has an embassy in Addis Ababa.

== See also ==
- Foreign relations of Ethiopia
- Foreign relations of Greece
- Greeks in Ethiopia
