= Hera Ammonia =

Ammonia (Greek: Ἀμμωνία) was an epithet of the Greek goddess Hera, under which she was worshiped in Elis. The inhabitants of that city had from the earliest times been in the habit of consulting the oracle of Zeus-Ammon (the aspect of the god the Greeks identified with the Egyptian Amun) in Libya.
