= Sha'r Awtar =

Sha'r Awtar (Sabaean: 𐩦𐩲𐩧𐩣 𐩱𐩥𐩩𐩧𐩣) was a king from the Hashid tribe related to Banu Hamdan which took control over the Kingdom of Saba'. His rule was contemporary with a rival tribe led by Il Sharih Yahdhib.

He led many campaigns against Hadhramaut and Axum in which he managed to defeat them.

== See also ==
- List of rulers of Saba and Himyar
