= Hélène Cuvigny =

French historian

Hélène Cuvigny, Directeur de recherche au CNRS, is a French papyrologist, specializing in the eastern Egyptian desert in Roman times.

== Biography ==
As part of a research project for the Institut Français d'Archéologie Orientale in Cairo, she was entrusted in 1994 with the exploration of the Roman garrisons network marking out the paths connecting Qift (formerly Coptos), on the Nile, to the ports of Qusayr al-Qadîm (Myos Hormos) and Berenice on the Red Sea.

She is responsible for the research program "Ostracon of the eastern desert" within the Institute of Papyrology at the Paris-Sorbonne University.

In 1995, she was appointed a member of the scientific council of the Institut Français d'Archéologie Orientale in Cairo. She served on the "commission to consider the nominations for French member of the Institut français d'archéologie orientale in Cairo" between 1997 and 2000.

== Publications ==
=== Books ===
- Ostraca de Krokodilô I. La correspondance militaire et sa circulation. Cairo: Institut Français d'Archéologie Orientale. 2005. p. 283. ISBN 2-7247-0370-7.
- La route de Myos Hormos : l'armée romaine dans le désert oriental d'Egypte. Praesidia du désert de Bérenice I. Cairo: Institut Français d'Archéologie Orientale. 2003. ISBN 2-7247-0340-5.
- Mons Claudianus : ostraca Graeca et Latina III. Les reçus pour avances à la "familia". O. Claud. 417 à 631. Cairo: Institut Français d'Archéologie Orientale. 2000. ISBN 2-7247-0274-3.
- Papyrus Graux II. P. Graux 9 à 29. Geneva: Droz. 1995. ISBN 9782600000413.

=== Articles ===
- Une prétendue taxe sur les autels : le phoros bômôn. Bulletin de l'Institut Français d'Archéologie Orientale (BIFAO). 1986. pp. 107–133.
- "Procurator Montis". Papyri in Honorem Johannis Bingen Octogenarii Editae. Louvain. 2000.
- Le paneion d'Al-Buwayb revisité. Bulletin de l'Institut Français d'Archéologie Orientale (BIFAO). 2000. pp. 243–266.
- Coptos, plaque tournante du commerce érythréen et les routes transdésertiques. le catalogue de l’exposition : Coptos, l’Égypte antique aux portes du désert, Lyon, musée des Beaux-Arts, 3 February – 7 May 2000. 2000. pp. 158–175.
- Claudius Lucilianus, préfet d'aile et de Bérénice ;Tr. Gagos, R.S. Bagnall (éd.), Essays and texts in honor of J.D. Thomas. American studies in papyrology. 2001.
