= ʽDBH =

Early 3rd century King of Aksum

King of Aksum
- Reign: c.230-240
- Predecessor: GDRT
- Successor: Sembrouthes
- Issue: GRMT

ʽDBH [probably vocalized ʽAzaba or ʽAdhebah] (fl. 3rd century) was a king of Aksum, in the territory of modern-day North Ethiopia and Eritrea, who ruled c. 230–240. He and his son GRMT (possibly vocalized as "Girmai") are known through South Arabian inscriptions which mention Shamir, king of Dhu-Raydan and Himyar asking for his help against the Sabaean kings.
