= DTWNS =

Late 3rd Century King of Aksum

King of Aksum
- Reign: c.260-270
- Predecessor: Sembrouthes
- Successor: Endybis

DTWNS (vocalized by historians as Datawnas) was a king of Aksum (c. 272). He is mentioned with his son ZQRNS (vocalized as "Zaqarnas") in an inscription from al-Mis`al in Yemen which Yasir Yuhan'im erected after defeating father and son.
