= Dar'a =

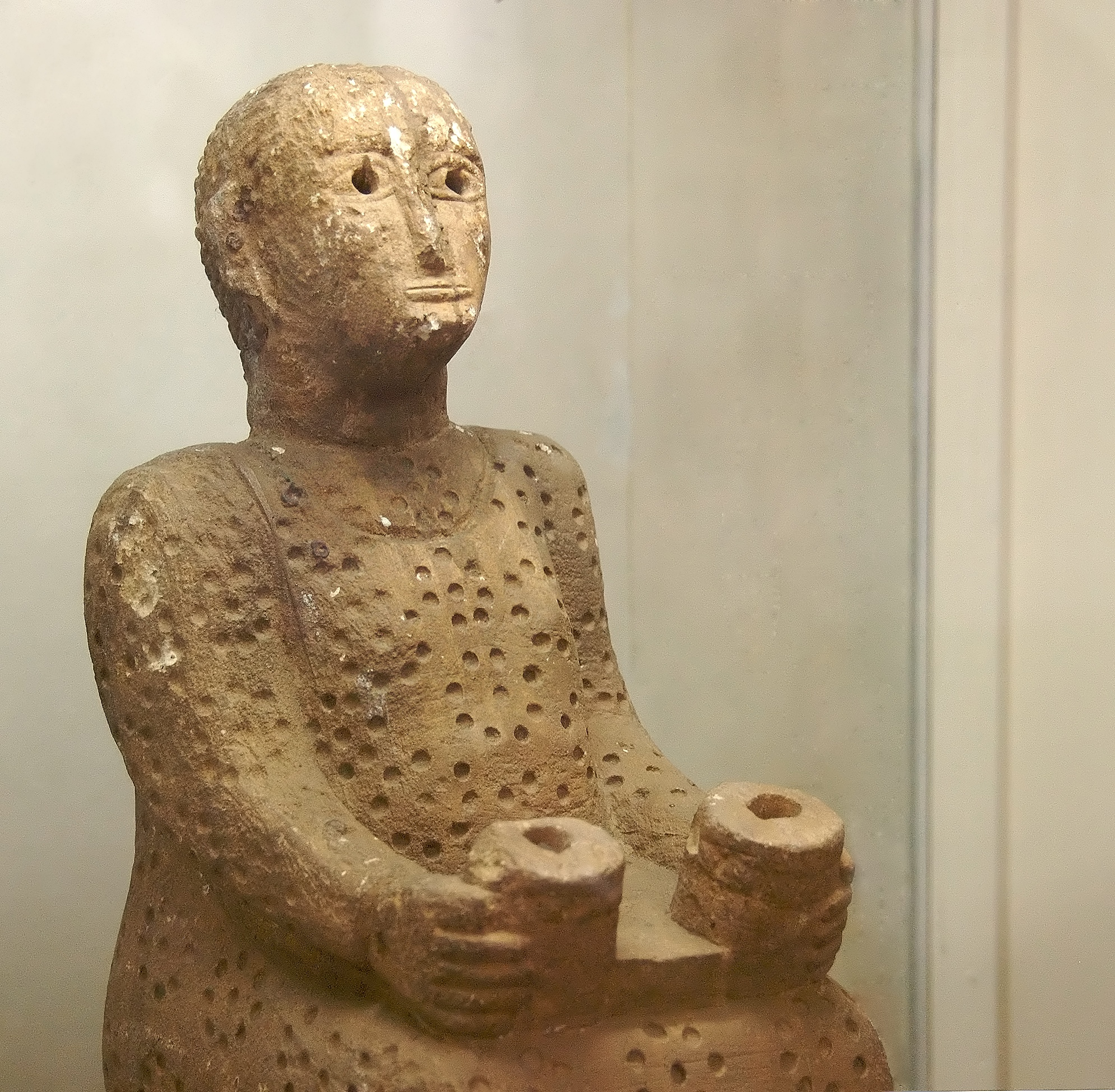
Stone statue from `Addi Galamo (dated 6th-5th century BCE), part of the National Museum of Ethiopia collection.

Dar'a, also known as Azbi-Dera, is an area in the eastern Tigray Region of northern Ethiopia. The city of `Addi Galamo, where many pre-Aksumite D`mt and Aksumite artifacts have been found is located in Dar'a.
