= Laurence P. Kirwan =

British archaeologist and geographer

Sir Archibald Laurence Patrick Kirwan KCMG (13 May 1907 – 16 April 1999) was a British archaeologist and geographer who made major contributions to the study of ancient Egypt, Nubia, East Africa and South Arabia. The Guardian, in his obituary, called him "one of the last survivors of the heroic age of archaeology". As Director and Secretary of the Royal Geographical Society from 1945 until 1975, he helped organize the first ascent of Mount Everest in 1953.

Kirwan was born in Cork, Ireland, second son of Patrick John Kirwan, of Cregg, County Galway, from an old Galway gentry family who built Cregg Castle in the 1600s, and Mabel, née Norton.

After King's College School, Wimbledon, Kirwan matriculated at Merton College, Oxford in 1925, but left the following year before completing his degree. (He later returned to his studies, and was awarded a BLitt in 1935.) He served as assistant director of the Egyptian government's Archaeological Survey of Nubia from 1929 to 1934 and then as field director of Oxford University's expeditions to Nubia between 1934 and 1937. From 1937 until 1939 he held a fellowship at Edinburgh University and did fieldwork in the Sudan and Aden. With the onset of the Second World War, he became a reserve officer in the Territorial Army, but in 1942 he became a staff officer attached to the Ministry of Defence. After the war, Kirwan took the reins of the Royal Geographical Society. Concurrently from 1961 to 1981 he was President of the British Institute in Eastern Africa.

In 1958, Kirwan was appointed a Companion of the Order of St Michael and St George (CMG), which was raised to Knight Commander in 1972. His first marriage, to Joan Chetwynd in 1932, ended in divorce. The couple had one daughter. In 1949, he married Stella Monck (she died in 1997). He died in a London hospice at the age of 91.

== Archives ==
Papers of Sir Kirwan are held by SOAS Special Collections
