= Aphilas =

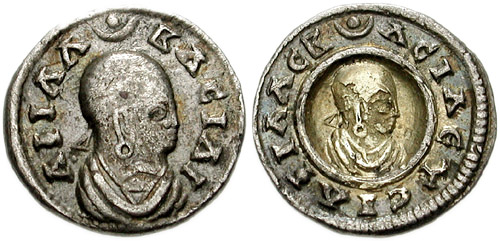
- Silver coin of Aphilas with gold inlay

King of Aksum
- Reign: 310s
- Predecessor: Endybis
- Successor: Wazeba

Aphilas beni Dimel (early 4th century) was a King of the Kingdom of Aksum. He is known only from the coins he minted, which are characterized by a number of experiments in imagery on the obverse, and being issued in fractions of weight that none of his successors copied.

G.W.B. Huntingford suggests that he was the ruler from the inscription on the throne at Adulis known as the Monumentum Adulitanum which celebrates military victories and claims to be erected in the 27th year of the ruler's reign. However David W. Phillipson seems to suggest otherwise, "coins of Aphilas – notwithstanding their diversity – are comparatively rare, and his reign may have been brief."

== Coins ==
Aphilas produced at least four series of gold coins (16mm, 12mm, 10mm, 7mm in diameter), two silver (17mm, 12mm in diameter), and two bronze (18mm, 15mm in diameter). Both of the larger gold coins feature the Aksumite tiara resting on his head cloth, which became the norm in future Aksumite coins. It is postulated that the Aksumite tiara was made for Aphilas. All coins feature the disc and crescent symbol of the Aksumite pagan period. All of his coins are inscribed in Ancient Greek, following the practice of his predecessor Endybis. The gold coins were weighted to the standard of the Roman aureus, the smallest gold coin of Aphilas being 1/16th aureus. The lowest gold content recorded for Aphilas is 90%; while high purity, this was lower than Roman coins.

The larger gold coins of Aphilas are the earliest known Aksumite coins to have reached India.

The smaller silver coin shows a distinguishing feature of Axumite coinage: the interior portrait is overlaid with gold. These were half value of the larger silver coin, but less than half the weight. They were probably deliberately underweight to counteract the cost of the gold gilding on the smaller coin.

At least two bronze coins feature Aphilas from a frontal position, as well as his 12mm gold coin. The style was abandoned afterwards until the 6th century. The typology and use of a frontal bust on Aphilas' coins appear to have taken inspiration from "special presentation pieces of the Roman emperor Licinius". On one of his bronze issues the obverse features an ear of wheat alone in the center. Ezana copied this design in a pre-Christian issue.

The coins of Aphilas generally feature the following inscription in Greek:

- Obverse: "AΦIΛAC BACIΛEYC" – "King Aphilas"
- Reverse: "AξωMITωN BICIΔIMIHΛH" – "of the Aksumites, man of Dimele"

Some copper coins include a variant inscription:

- Obverse: "AΦIΛACBA CIΛEYCAξω" – "King Aphilas of the Aksu..."
- Reverse: "MITωNBI CIΔIMIHΛH" – "...mites, man of Dimele"
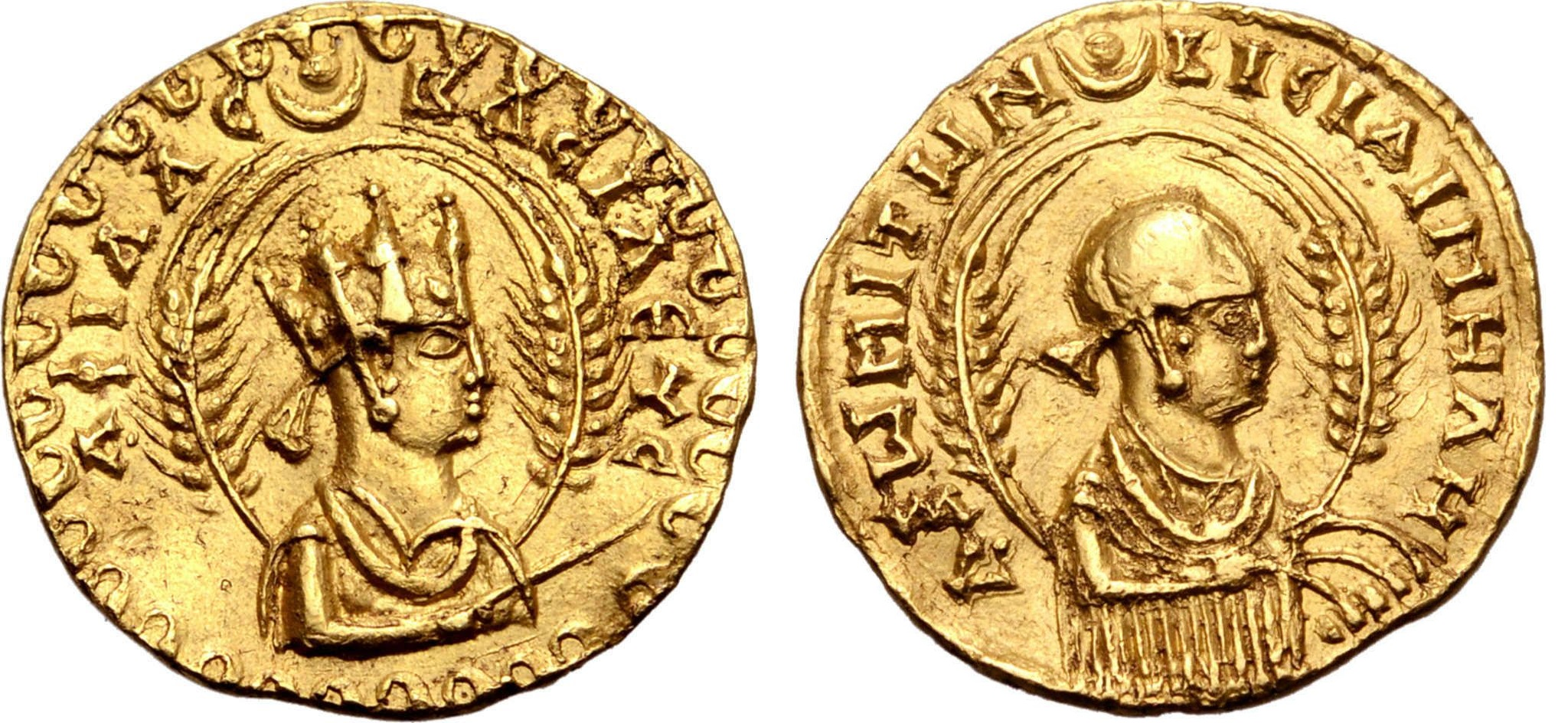
16mm Gold issue featuring Aksumite tiara.

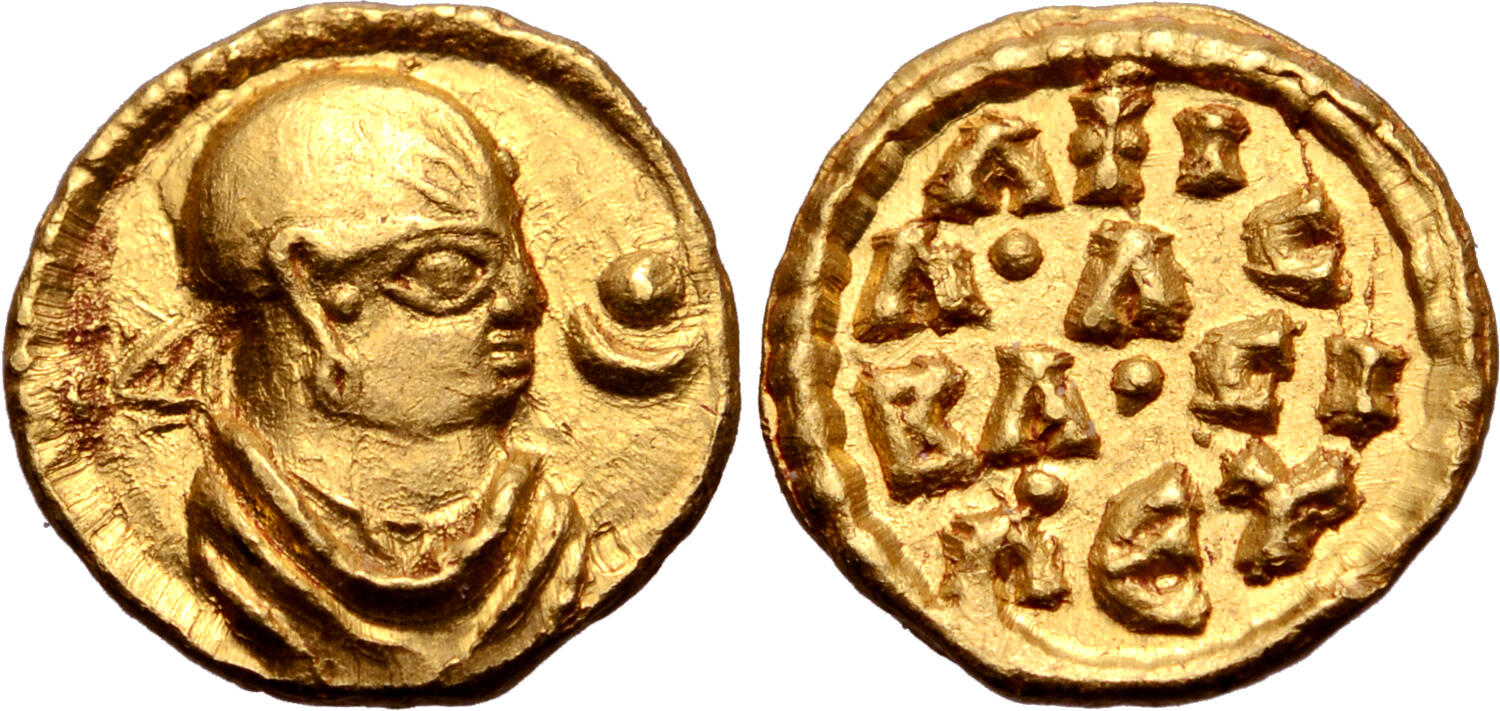
Smallest gold coin of Aphilas. Just 7mm in diameter. Obverse reads 'King Aphilas'.

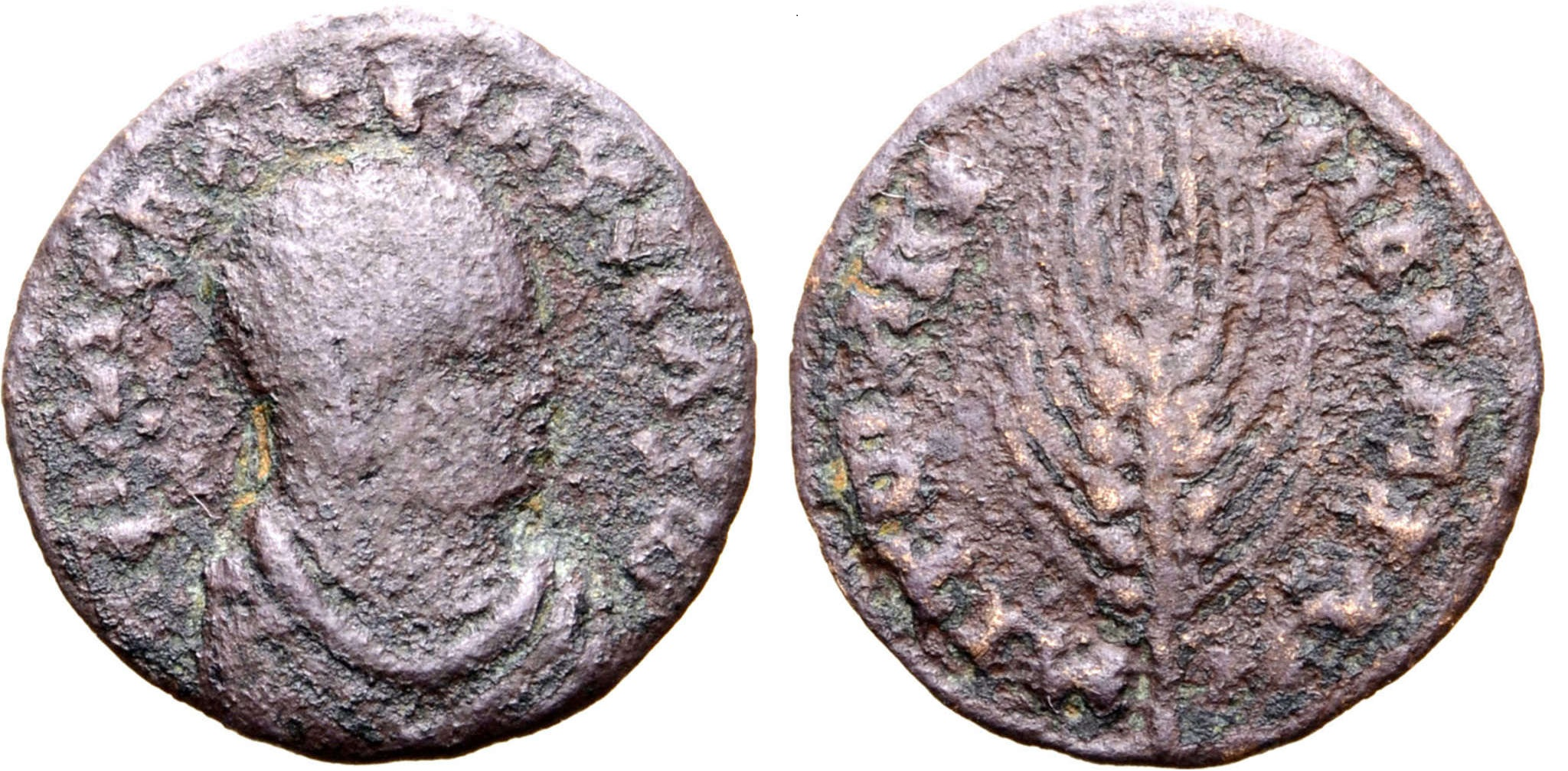
Bronze coin with wheat alone on obverse.

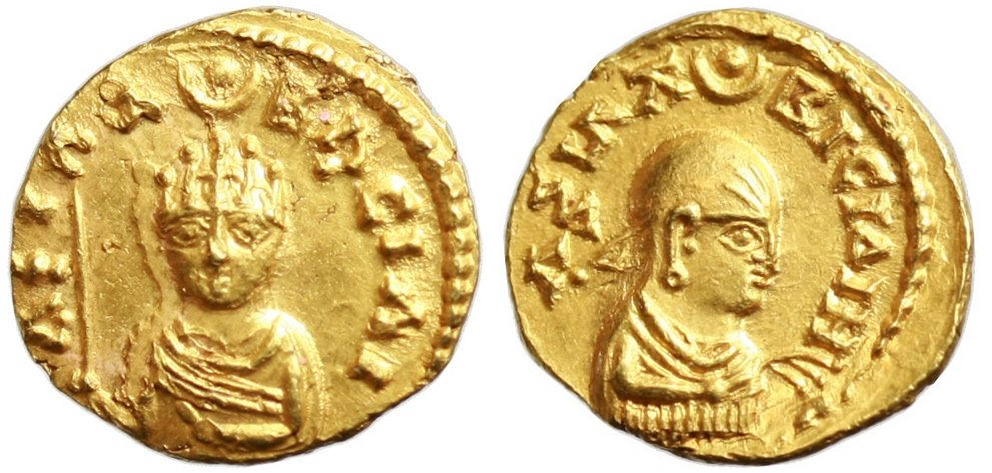
12mm gold coin noteworthy for Aphilas' frontal position.
