= Obelisk of Axum =

4th-century phonolite stele in Axum, Tigray Region, Ethiopia

- ሓወልቲ ኣኽሱም
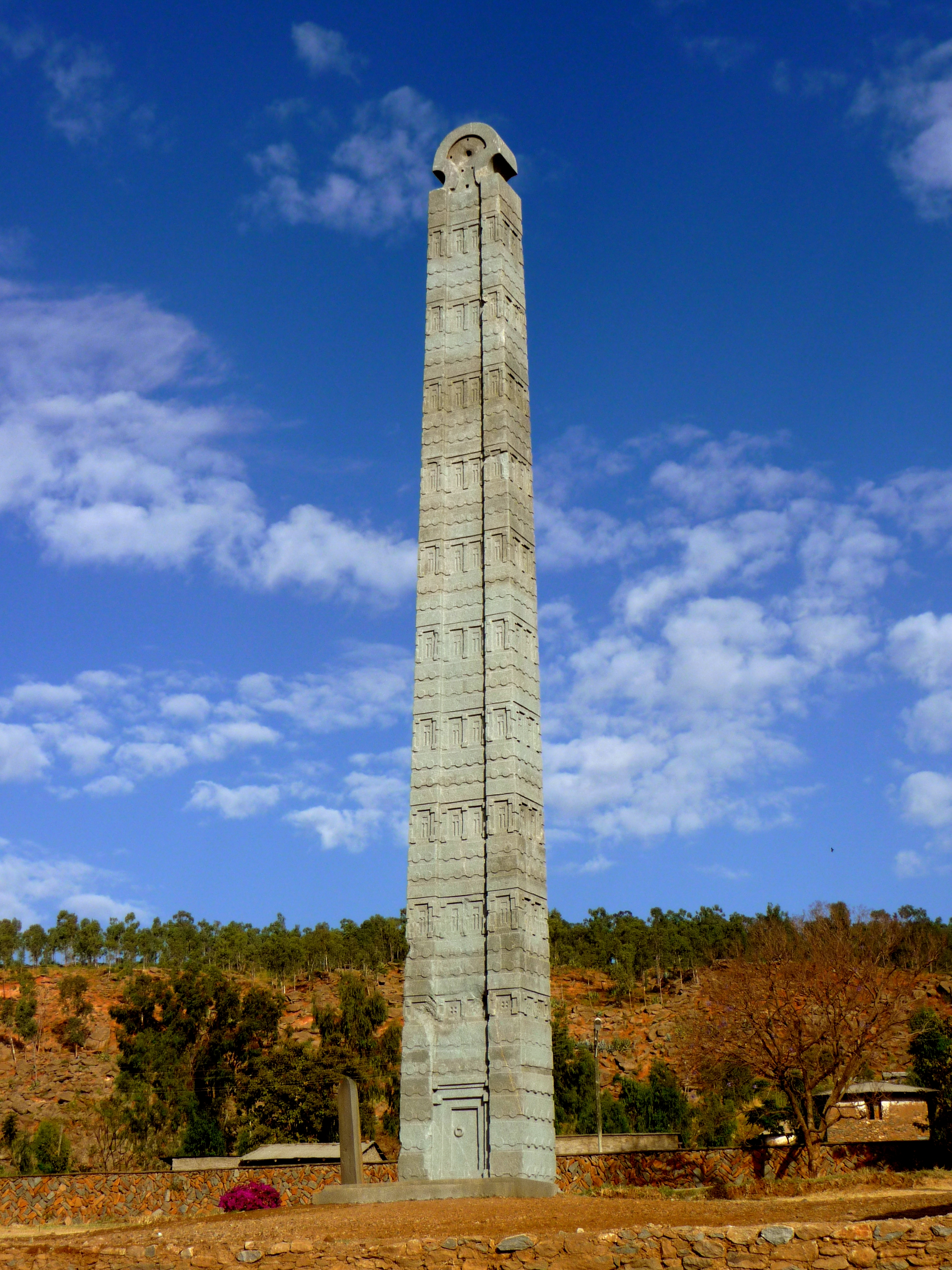
- The Obelisk of Axum in Axum, Tigray Region (2009)
- Interactive map of Obelisk of Axum
- Location: Axum, Central Zone, Tigray Region, Ethiopia
- Coordinates: 14°7′56″N 38°43′11″E
- Type: Aksumite stele
- Material: Single, solid block of a weather-resistant stone similar to granite
- Height: 24 m (79 ft)
- Completion date: 4th-century
- Restored date: 19 April 2005

UNESCO World Heritage Site
- Location: Ethiopia
- Criteria: (i)(iv)
- Inscription: 1980 (4th Session)
- Area: Tigray Region
- Website: Official website

The Obelisk of Axum (Tigrinya: ሓወልቲ ኣኽሱም, romanized: ḥawelti Akhsum; Amharic: የአክሱም ሐውልት, romanized: Ye’Åksum ḥāwelt) is a 4th-century AD, 24-metre (79 ft) tall phonolite stele, weighing 160 tonnes (160 long tons; 180 short tons), in the city of Axum in Ethiopia. It is ornamented with two false doors at the base and features decorations resembling windows on all sides. The obelisk ends in a semi-circular top, which used to be enclosed by metal frames.

== History ==
=== Overview ===
The 'obelisk'—properly termed a stele (Note: Although the title of "Obelisk of Axum" is applied to it, the monument does not qualify as an obelisk as it is not tapered or pointed at its top. It is a stele, despite the widely used appellation.) or, in the local languages, Tigrinya: hawelti; and church Geʽez: hawelti—is found along with many other steles in the city of Axum in modern-day Ethiopia. The steles were probably carved and erected during the 4th century AD by subjects of the Kingdom of Aksum, an ancient Ethiopian civilization. Erection of steles in Axum was a very old practice. Their function is supposed to be as "markers" for underground burial chambers. The largest of the grave markers were for royal burial chambers and were decorated with multi-story false windows and false doors, while lesser nobility would have smaller, less decorated ones. While there are only a few large ones standing, there are hundreds of smaller ones in various "steles fields". It is still possible to see primitive, roughly carved steles near more elaborate "obelisks". The last stele erected in Axum was probably the so-called King Ezana's Stele, in the 4th century.

King Ezana (c. 321 – c. 360), influenced by his childhood tutor Frumentius, introduced Christianity to Axum, precluding the pagan practice of erecting burial steles (it seems that at the feet of each obelisk, together with the grave, there was also a sacrificial altar.

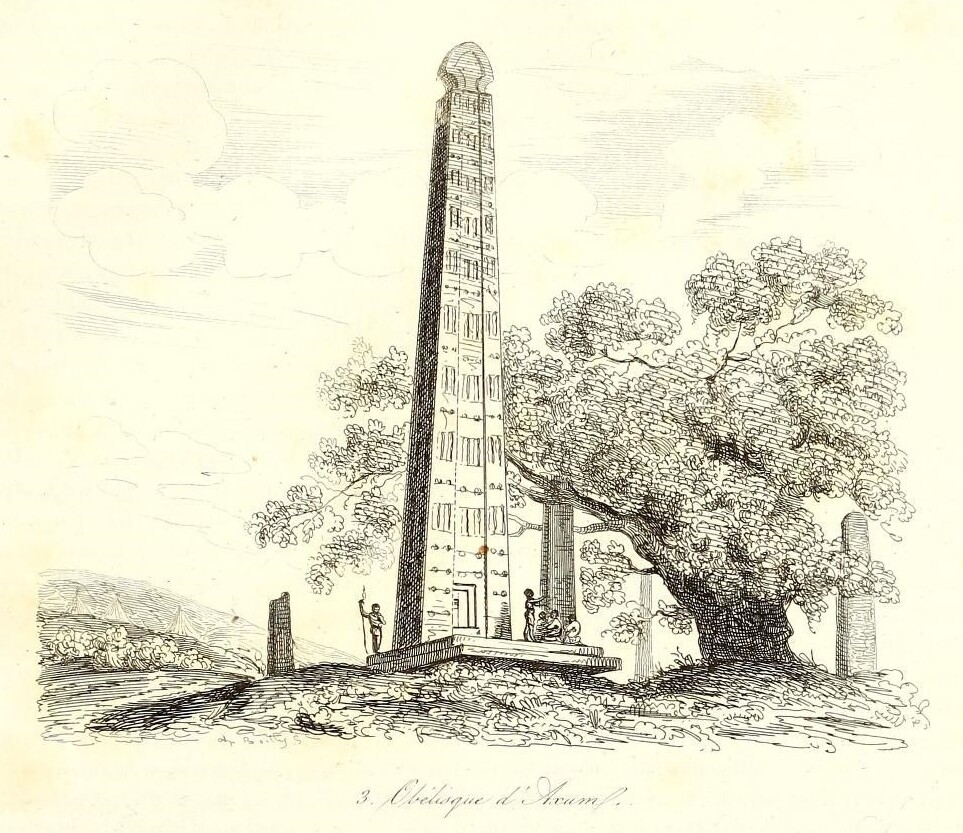
The obelisk, represented in the book Voyage pittoresque en Asie et en Afrique, from 1839.

Over the course of time, many of these steles fell over due to several reasons: structural collapse (as, probably, in the case of the Great Stele, measuring 33 m), possibly immediately after their erection; earthquakes (Axum is in a seismic zone); or the military incursions of the Imam Ahmad Ibrahim during the Ethiopian–Adal War from 1529 to 1543. In the 19th century, of the three major "royal" steles, only King Ezana's Stele remained erect, shown in the print "The Obelisk at Axum" of Henry Salt (1780–1827) and in the photograph taken by Mabel Bent in 1893. Salt travelled back to England with Captain Thomas Fremantle, and the design of the Obelisk of Axum influenced that of the Nelson Monument, Portsdown Hill, near Portsmouth Harbour, for which Fremantle raised the funds.

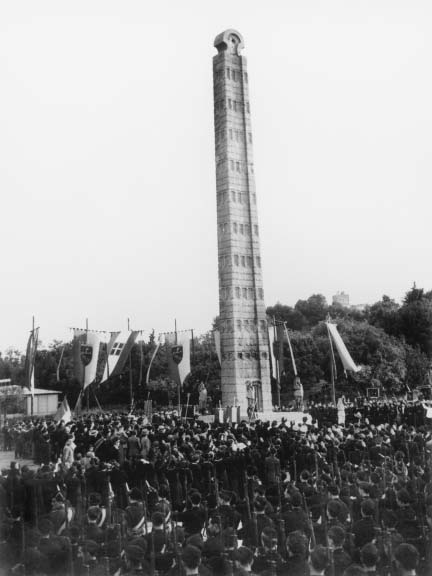
Unveiling of the obelisk in Rome, 1937

The Italian occupation of Ethiopia ended in 1937 with looting, in which the Obelisk of Axum was taken to Italy as war spoil. The monolith was cut into three pieces and transported by truck along the tortuous route between Axum and the port of Massawa, taking five trips over a period of two months. It travelled by the ship, Adwa, arriving in Naples on March 27, 1937. It was then transported to Rome, where it was restored, reassembled and erected on Porta Capena square in front of the Ministry for Italian Africa (later the headquarters of the United Nations's Food and Agriculture Organization) and the Circus Maximus. The obelisk was officially unveiled on October 28, 1937 to commemorate the fifteenth anniversary of the March on Rome. The operation was coordinated by Ugo Monneret de Villard.

A bronze statue of the Lion of Judah, symbol of the Ethiopian monarchy, was taken along with the obelisk and displayed in front of Termini railway station.

=== Repatriation ===
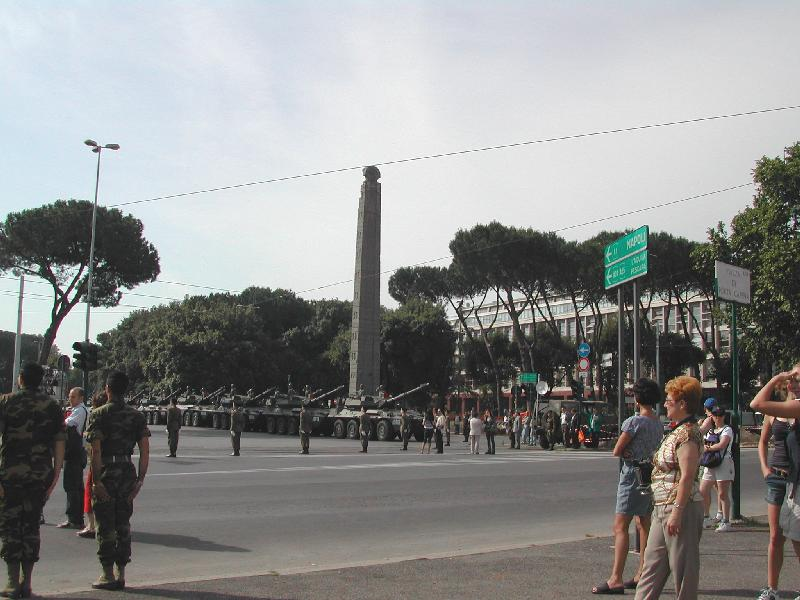
The Obelisk in Rome, Italy, before its repatriation

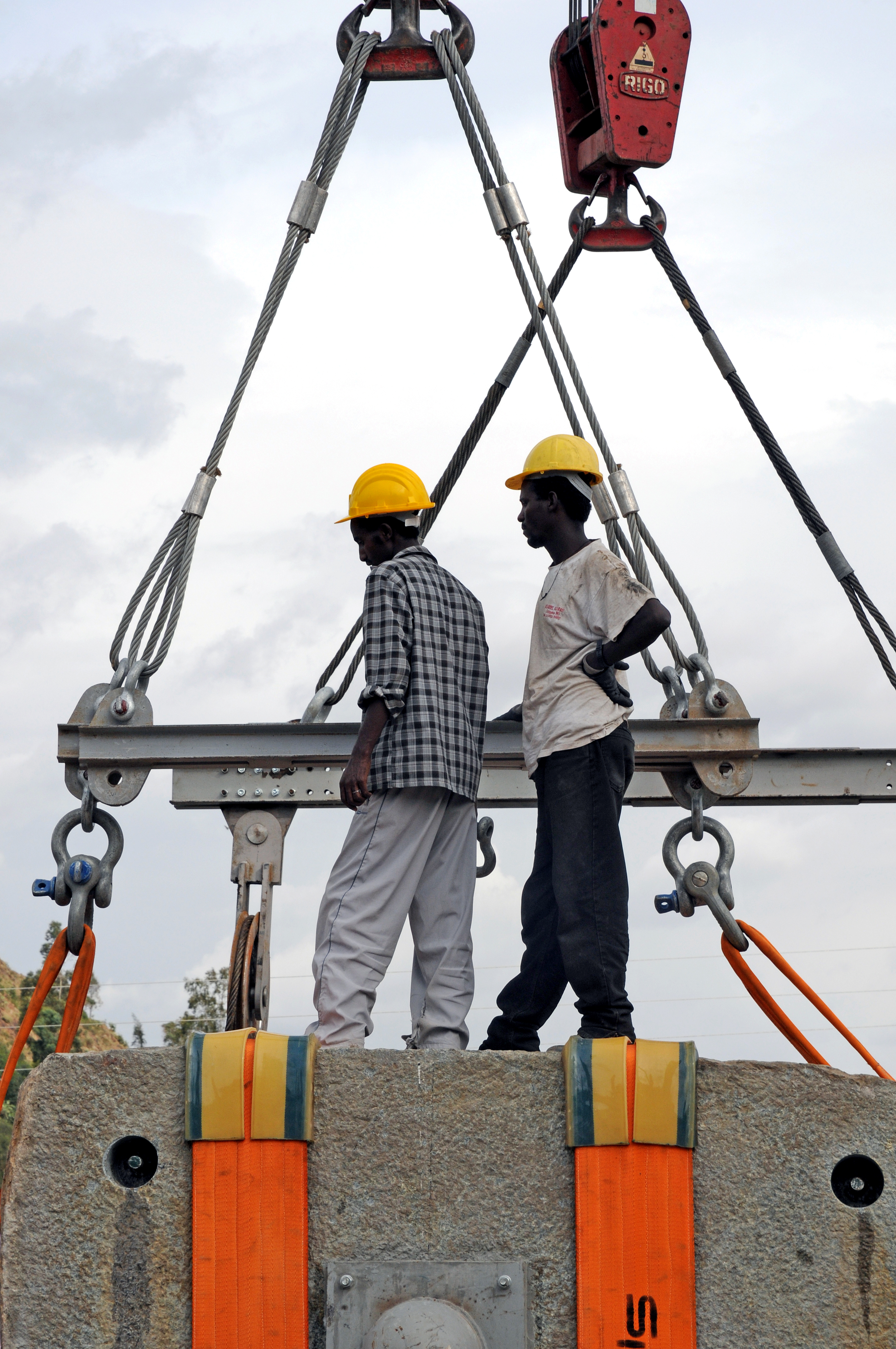
Workers during Aksum Obelisk re-installation

In a 1947 UN agreement, Italy agreed to return the stele to Ethiopia, along with the other looted piece, the Monument to the Lion of Judah. While the latter was returned in 1967 following the 1961 visit of emperor Haile Selassie to Italy, little action was taken to return the stele for more than 50 years, partly as a consequence of the considerable technical difficulties related to its transportation.

One source also suggests that emperor Haile Sellassie, after hearing of these technical difficulties (and of the enormous costs necessary to overcome them), decided to grant the stele to the city of Rome, as a gift for the "renewed friendship" between Italy and Ethiopia. This assertion, however, remains controversial and was not recognized by successive authorities. Colonel Mengistu Haile Mariam, who overthrew the emperor in 1974, asked the Italian government to return the stele to Ethiopia. Another controversial arrangement, according to some sources, seems to be that Italy could keep the stele in exchange for the construction of a hospital in Addis Ababa (Saint Paul's Hospital) and for the cancellation of debts owed by Ethiopia. In any case, after the fall of the Mengistu regime, the new Ethiopian government asked for the return of the stele, finding a positive answer from the then president of the Italian republic Oscar Luigi Scalfaro, in April 1997.

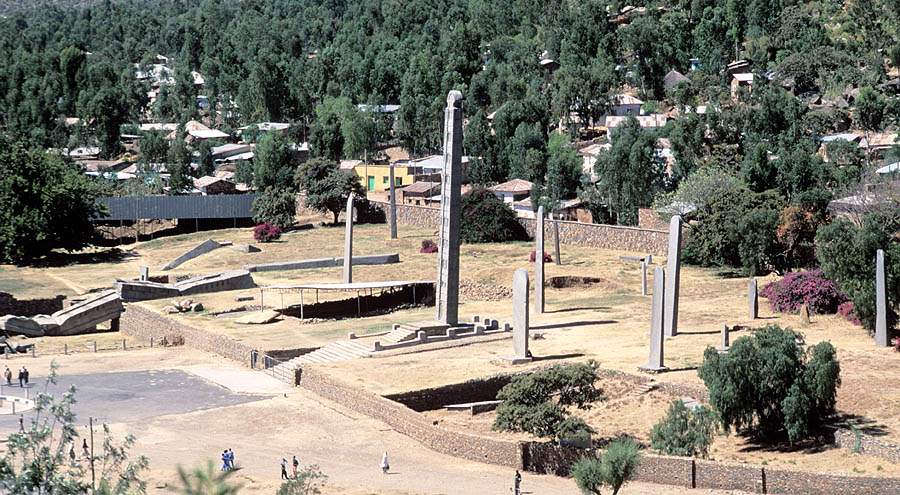
The Northern Stelae Park in Axum, with the King Ezana's Stele at the centre and the Great Stele lying broken.

The first steps in dismantling the structure were taken in November 2003, under the supervision of Giorgio Croci, Professor of Structural Problems of Monuments and Historical Buildings at Sapienza University of Rome. The intent was to ship the stele back to Ethiopia in March 2004, but the repatriation project encountered a series of obstacles: The runway at Axum Airport was considered too short for a cargo plane carrying even one of the thirds into which the stele had been cut; the roads and bridges between Addis Ababa and Axum were thought to be not up to the task of road transport; and access through the nearby Eritrean port of Massawa—which was how the stele originally left Africa—was impossible due to the strained state of relations between Eritrea and Ethiopia.

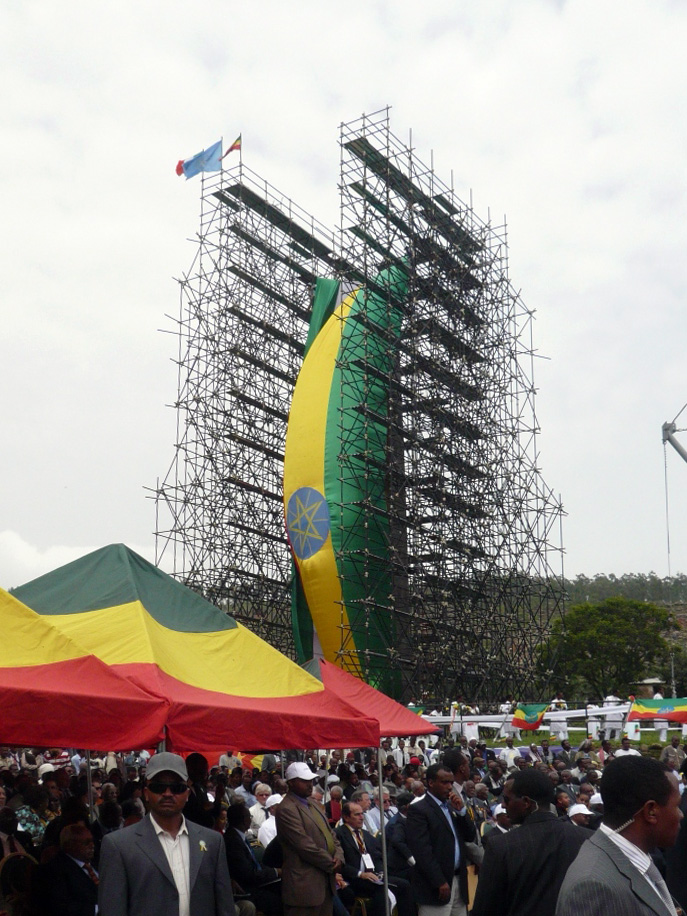
Inauguration Ceremony for the reinstallation of the Aksum Obelisk

The runway at Axum airport was then upgraded specifically to facilitate the return of the stele. The dismantled stele remained sitting in a warehouse near Rome's Leonardo Da Vinci International Airport, until 19 April 2005 when the middle piece was repatriated by use of an Antonov An-124, amidst much local celebration. It has been described as the largest and heaviest piece of air freight ever carried. The second piece was returned on 22 April 2005, with the final piece returned on 25 April 2005. The operation cost Italy $7.7 million.

The stele remained in storage while Ethiopia decided how to reconstruct it without disturbing other ancient treasures still in the area (especially King Ezana's Stele). By March 2007 the foundation had been poured for the re-erection of the stele near King Ezana's Stele, structurally consolidated in this occasion. Reassembly began in June 2008, with a team chosen by UNESCO and led by Giorgio Croci, and the monument was re-erected in its original home and unveiled on 4 September 2008.

When it was reassembled in Rome in 1937, three steel bars were inserted per section. When the obelisk was hit by lightning during a violent thunderstorm over Rome on 27 May 2002, this caused "considerable" damage. In the new reconstruction the three sections are fixed together by a total of eight aramid fiber (Kevlar) bars: four between the first and second and four between the second and third sections. This arrangement guarantees structural resistance during earthquakes and avoids the use of steel, so as not to again make the steel a magnet for lightning and to avoid rust.

Several other similar stelae/obelisks exist in Ethiopia and Eritrea, such as the Hawulti in Metera. Like the Obelisk of Axum, the other stelae have a rectangular base with a false door carved on one side.

== 3-D laser scanning ==
The Zamani Project documents cultural heritage sites in 3D based on terrestrial laser-scanning to create a historical record. The 3D documentation of parts of the Axum Stelae Field was carried out in 2006.

== Gallery ==
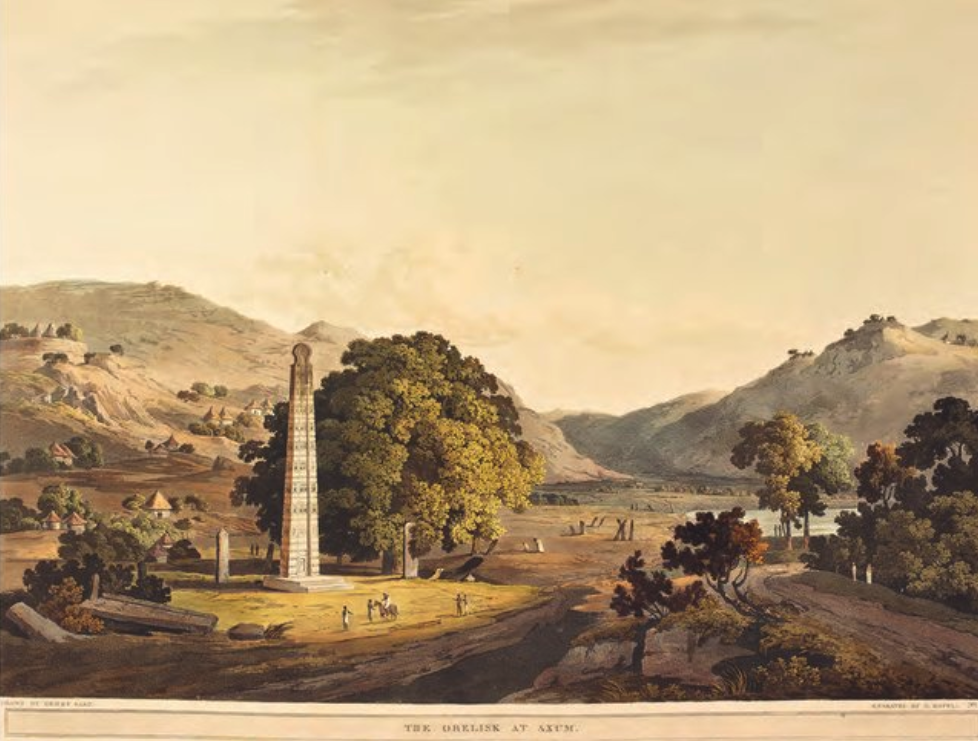
The Obelisk at Axum in 1805

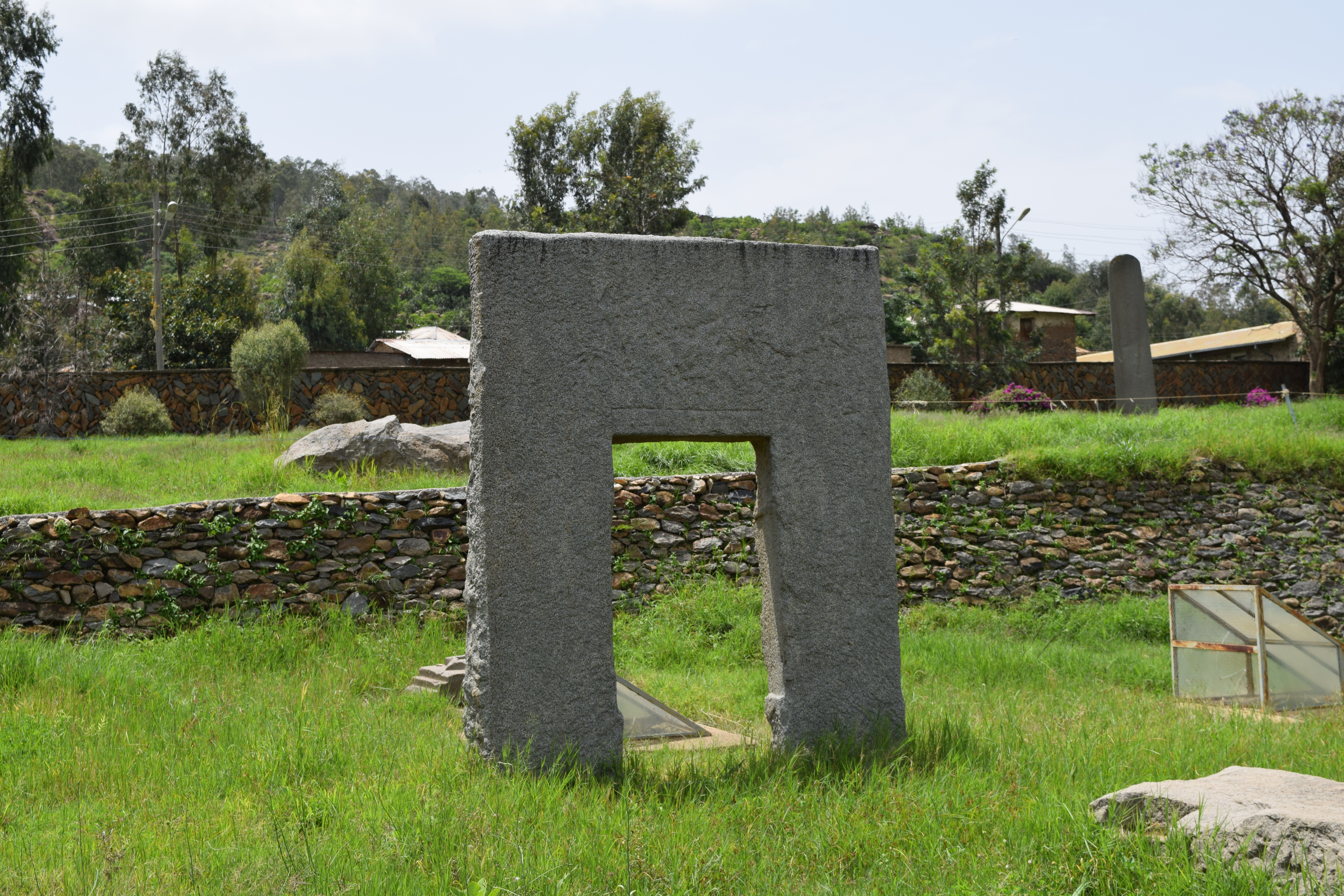
Entrance hewn out of stone

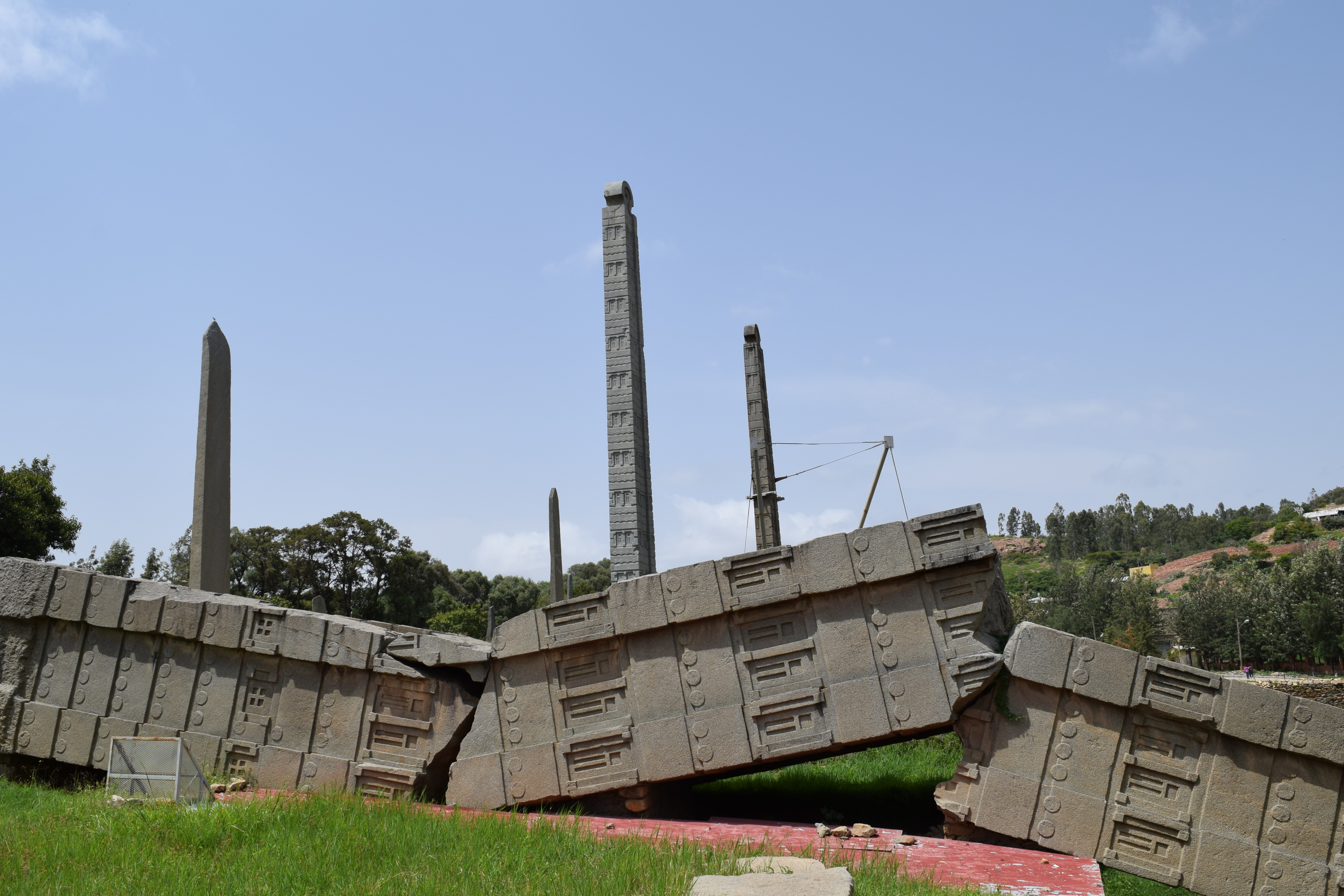
Broken remains of the Great Stele

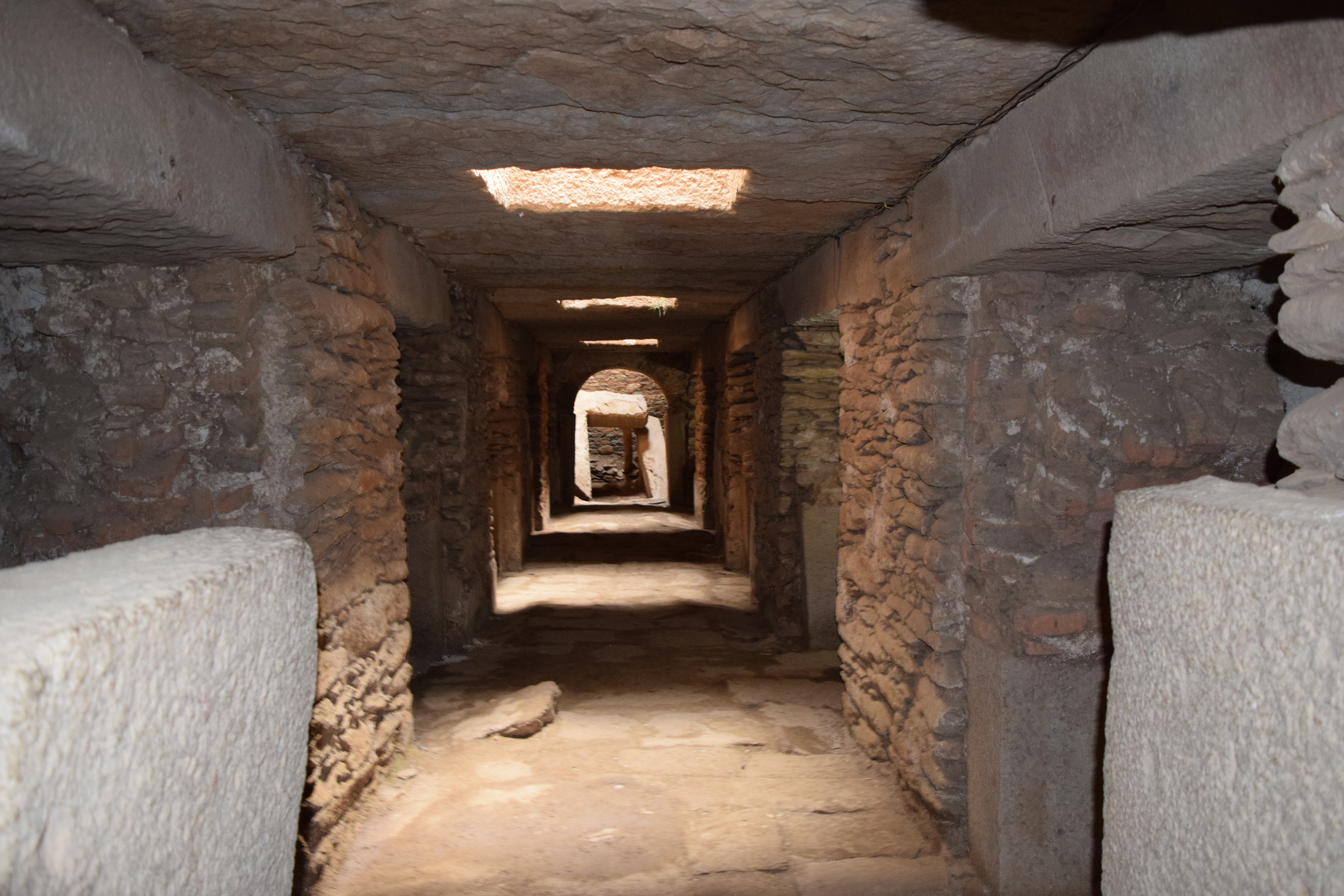
Burial chambers of the kings

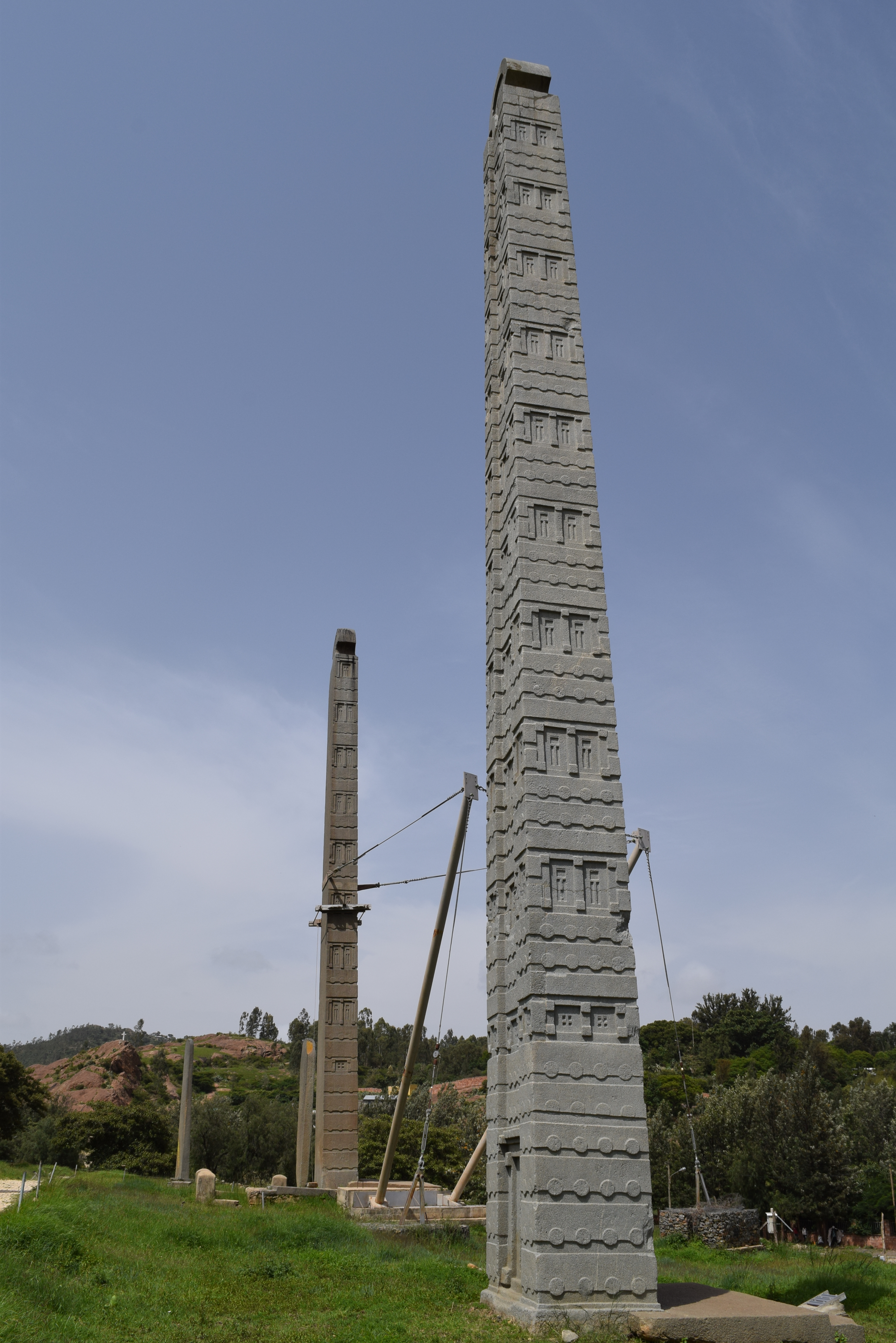
Obelisks of Aksum
