= Ousanas =

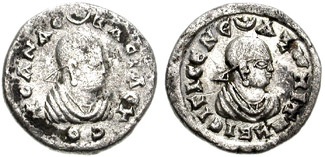

King of Aksum
- Reign: early 320s to late 320s
- Predecessor: Wazeba
- Successor: Ezana
- Spouse: Sofya
- Issue: Ezana; Saizana; Hadefa

Ousanas (fl. 320), known as Ella Allada or Ella Amida in Eritrean and Ethiopian tradition, was the ruler of the Kingdom of Aksum in the 320s AD.

Little is known about his life, but he may have invaded and imposed tribute upon Nubia, and he may have had a "relatively long reign". His reign may have been briefly interrupted by the usurper Wazeba.

Stuart Munro-Hay believes that it is "very likely" that Ousanas is the king to whom Aedesius and Frumentius were brought. W.R.O. Hahn, in a study published in 1983, identifies Sembrouthes, who is known only from an inscription found in Daqqi Mahari in modern Eritrea, with Ousanas. If correct, this would give Ousanas a reign of at least 27 years.

== Axumite regnal lists and alternate names ==
Ethiopian tradition credits Abreha and Atsbeha with being the first Christian kings of the country. They were likely based on the brothers Ezana and Saizana, sons of Ousanas. The name of the father and regnal predecessor of Abreha and Atsbeha varies between sources. Ousanas has been known as either Ameda/Ella Ameda, Tazer and/or Sayfa Arad depending on the text or regnal list.

Ousanas appears on several regnal lists under the name of "Ameda" or "Ela Amida". Lists recorded by Pedro Páez, Henry Salt and E. A. Wallis Budge place king "Ameda" as the thirtieth to reign after Bazen (c. 8 BC–9 AD E.C.) and state that he reigned for either 30 years and 8 months or 40 years and 8 months.

Another king that named on regnal lists is "Tazer", who appears as the predecessor of Abreha and Atsbeha on a list recorded by Carlo Conti Rossini. According to a book titled Gedle Abreha and Asbeha from the Church of Abreha wa-Atsbeha, Tazer was the father of Abreha and Atsbeha and his wife was Sofya, therefore it is likely that Tazer is the same person as Ousanas.

According to Rossini's list, king Tazer's throne name was "Sayfa Ared". The Tarika Nagast (History of Kings) additionally claims that the father of Abreha and Atsbeha was king Sayfa-Ar'ed. A king of this name is listed on different regnal lists recorded by Páez and James Bruce, but not as Abreha and Atsbeha's direct predecessor.

== Coinage ==
Several types of coins were minted during the reign of Ousanas: one type in gold, four in silver, and two in copper. All but one of the copper issues are distinguished from his later namesake by a disc and crescent above the head of the king, symbols of the Sun-goddess Shams and the Moon-god Sin.

Munro-Hay has described the unique gold piece minted during his reign as evidence that "the Aksumite die-cutters reached the zenith of their accomplishment". He speculates that Ousanas' predecessor had recruited expert die-cutters "perhaps from Alexandria, where the current coinage resembled that produced at Aksum", and others followed as late as Ousanas' reign.

Coins with the name of this ruler were found in the late 1990s at archaeological sites in India. The coins of Ousanas were lighter than those of his predecessors, likely due to Roman emperor Constantine I transferring lighter gold coins to the Eastern Roman Empire.

Coins of Ousanas usually bear the following inscriptions:

- Obverse: "OYCANAC ΒΑϹΙΛΕΥϹ" – "King Ousanas".
- Reverse: "AξωMITωNBI CIΓICENE" – "of the Aksumites, man of Gisene".

Some copper coins have an alternate reverse inscription:

- "Aξ+ ωMI" – "[of the] Aksum[ites]".

== See also ==
- Sofya
