= King Ezana's Stele =

One of obelisks of Axum in Tigray Region, Ethiopia

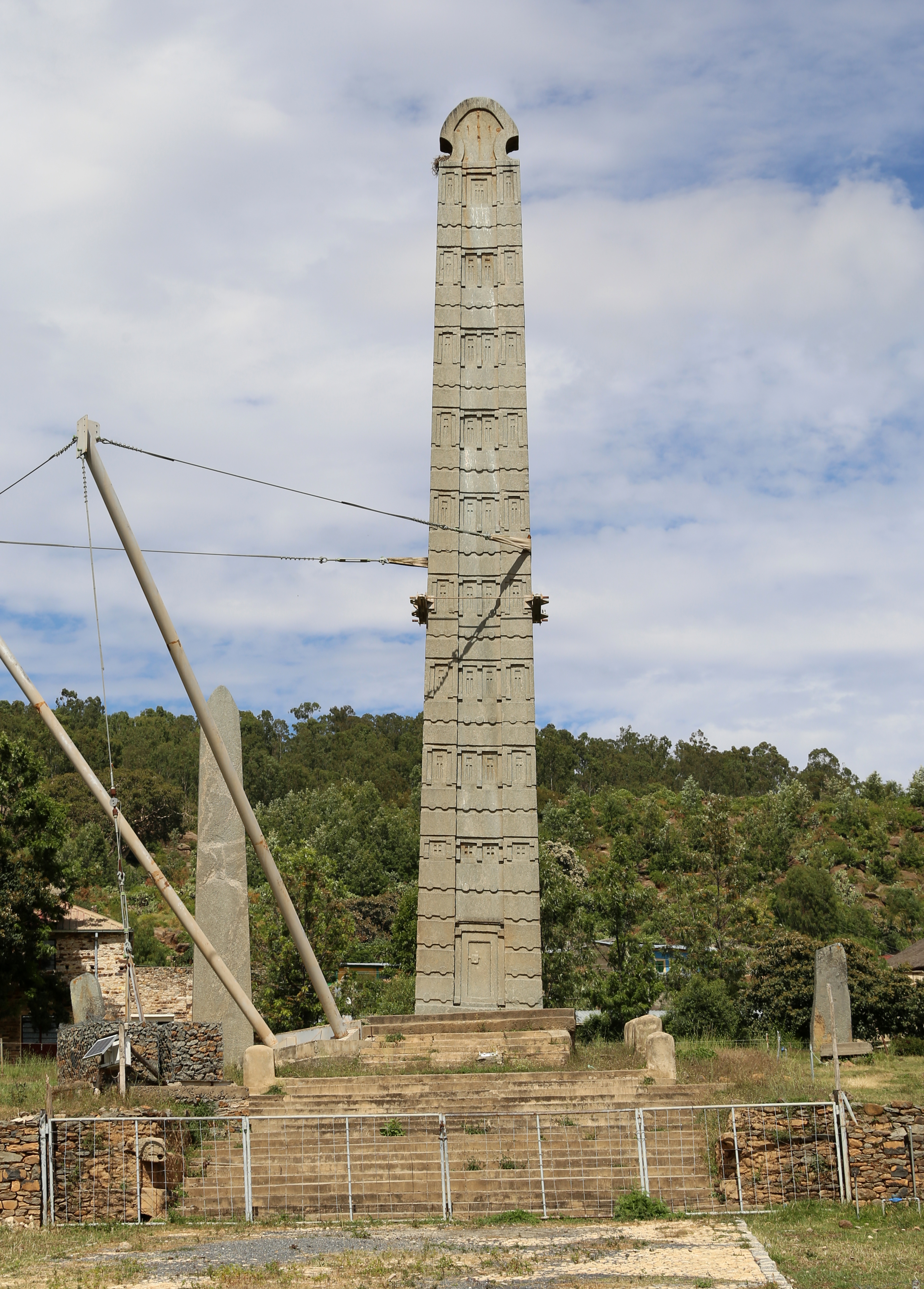
- King Ezana's Stele
- Interactive map of King Ezana's Stele
- Location: Axum, Central Zone, Tigray Region, Ethiopia
- Coordinates: 14.1321°N 38.7195°E
- Type: Aksumite stele
- Material: Single piece of local granite
- Height: 21 m (69 ft)
- Completion date: 4th century AD
- Dedicated to: Ezana of Axum

UNESCO World Heritage Site
- Type: Cultural
- Criteria: i, iv
- Designated: 1980 (43rd session)
- Part of: Aksum
- Reference no.: 15

King Ezana's Stele is a 4th century obelisk in the ancient city of Axum, in the Tigray Region of Ethiopia. The monument stands in the middle of the Northern Stelae Park, which contains hundreds of smaller and less decorated stelae. This stele is probably the last one erected and the largest of those that remain unbroken. King Ezana of Axum's Stele stands 21 m (69 ft) tall, smaller than the collapsed 33 m (108 ft) Great Stele and the better-known 24 m (79 ft) "Obelisk of Axum" (reassembled and unveiled on 4 September 2008). It is decorated with a false door at its base and apertures resembling windows on all sides.

== History ==
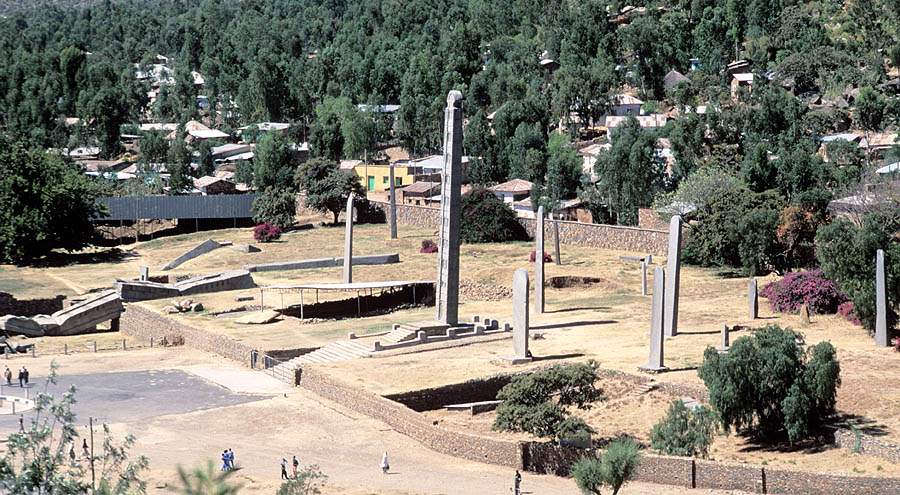
The Northern Stelae Park in Axum in 2002, with King Ezana's Stele at the middle and the Great Stela lying broken. (The Obelisk of Axum was returned later.)

This monument, properly termed a stele (hawilt or hawilti in the local Afroasiatic languages) was carved and erected in the 4th century by subjects of the Kingdom of Aksum, an ancient civilization focussed in the Ethiopian Highlands and Eritrean Highlands. The stelae are thought to be "markers" for underground burial chambers. The largest grave markers were for royal burial chambers and were decorated with multi-story false windows and false doors; nobility would have smaller, less decorated stelae. King Ezana's Stele is likely to be the last example of this practice, which was abandoned after the Axumites adopted Christianity under King Ezana. Ezana was the first monarch of Axum to embrace the faith, following the teachings and examples of his childhood tutor, Frumentius. King Ezana's Stele is also the only one of the three major "royal" obelisks (the others being the Great Stele and the Obelisk of Axum) that was never broken.

In 2007–2008, during the reassembly of the Obelisk of Axum, which had been taken to Italy in 1937 and returned to Ethiopia in 2005, King Ezana's Stela was structurally consolidated by a team of engineers led by Giorgio Croci, Professor of Structural Problems of Monuments and Historical Buildings at Sapienza University of Rome.

== See also ==
- Ezana Stone
- Hawulti (monument)
