= Ezana Stone =

Stele still standing in present-day Ethiopia

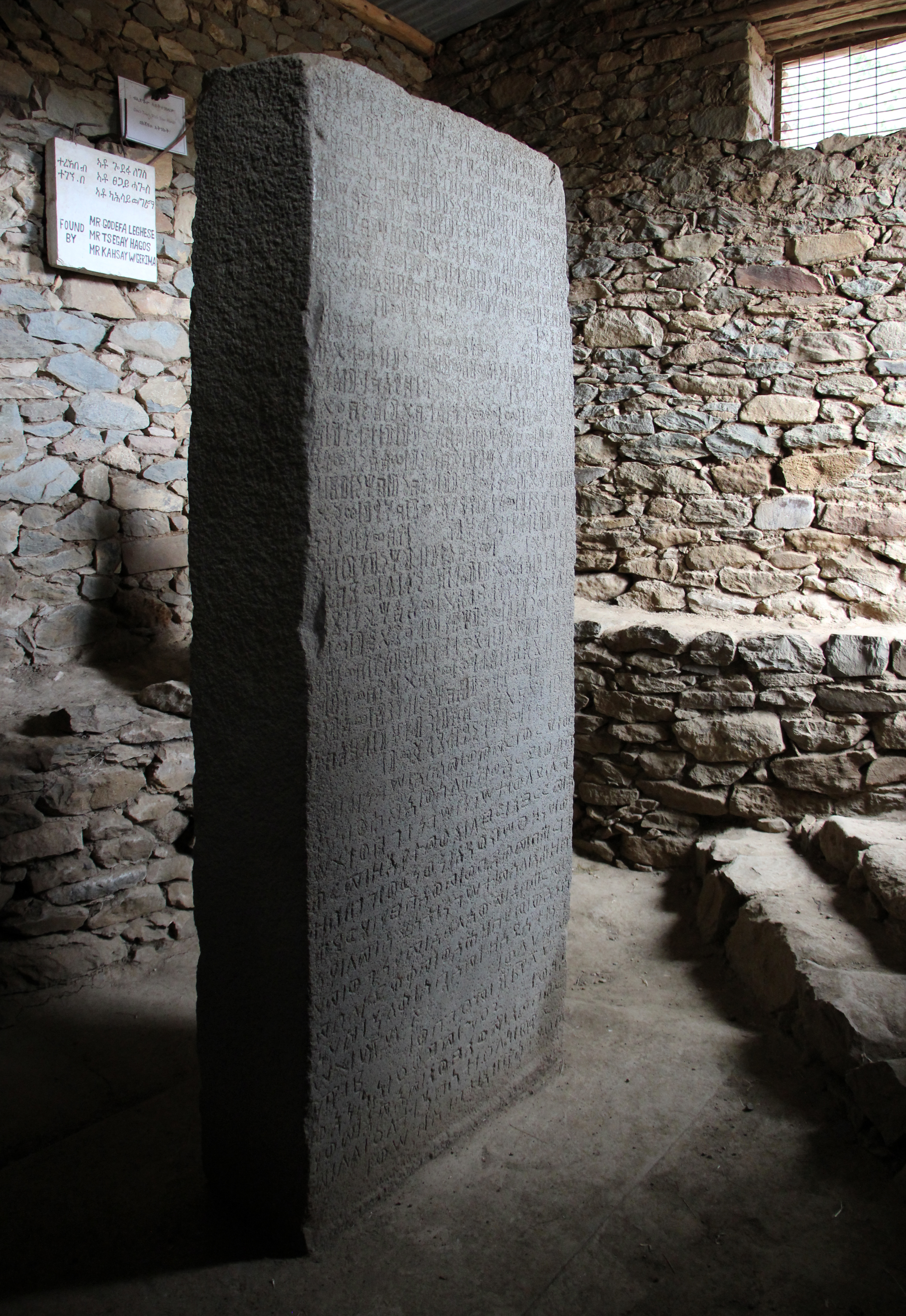
- The Ezana Stone
- Interactive map of Ezana Stone
- Location: Aksum
- Coordinates: 14°8′16.29″N 38°43′22.52″E
- Type: Stele
- Dedicated to: King Ezana

UNESCO World Heritage Site
- Type: Cultural
- Criteria: i, iv
- Designated: 1980 (43rd session)
- Part of: Aksum
- Reference no.: 15

The Ezana Stone is an ancient stele still standing in modern-day Axum in Ethiopia, the centre of the ancient Kingdom of Aksum. This stone monument, that probably dates from the 4th century of the Christian era, documents the conversion of King Ezana to Christianity and his conquest of various neighbouring areas, including Meroë.

From AD 330 to 356, King Ezana ruled the ancient Kingdom of Aksum centred in the Horn of Africa. He fought against the Nubians, and commemorated his victories on stone tablets in praise of God. These liturgical epigraphs were written in various ancient languages, including the Ethiopian Semitic Geʽez, the South Arabian Sabaic, and Greek. The king's engravings in stone provided a trilingual monument in different languages, similar to the Rosetta Stone.

The Ethiopian Orthodox Tewahedo Church had its beginnings during this period. Rufinus's Ecclesiastical History narrates that Saint Frumentius, a freed slave and tutor for the very young King, converted him to Christianity. Towards the end of his reign, King Ezana launched a campaign against the Kushites around 350 which brought down the Kingdom of Kush. Various stone inscriptions written in Geʽez (using the Geʽez script) have been found at Meroë, the central city of the Kushites.

== Text ==
=== Greek translation ===
Ezana, son of Ella Amida, king of the Aksumites, the Himyarites, Raeidan, the Ethiopians, the Sabaeans, Silei (Salhen), Tiyamo, the Beja and Kasou, king of kings, son of the unconquered god Ares. Since the people of the Beja rose up, we sent our brothers Saiazana and Adefan to fight them. When these had taken arms against the enemy, they made them submit and they brought them to us with their dependents, with 3112 head of cattle, 6224 sheep, and beasts of burden. My brothers gave them meat and wheat to eat, and beer, wine, and water to drink, all to their satisfaction whatever their number. There were six chiefs with their peoples, to the number of 4400 and they received each day 22,000 loaves of wheat and wine for four months until my brothers had brought them to me. After having given them all means of sustenance, and clothed them, we installed these prisoners by force in a place in our land called Matlia. And we commanded again that they are given supplies, and we accorded to each chief 25,140 head of cattle. I have consecrated this stele and dedicated it to Heaven, the Earth, and the invincible Ares who begat me. Should anyone wish to damage it, may the god of Heaven and Earth lead him to ruin, and his name ceases to exist in the land of the living. In gratitude, this has been consecrated for well-being. Furthermore, we have consecrated to the invincible Ares a COY'ATE and a BE?IE.

=== Geʽez translation ===
By the might of the Lord of Heaven who in the sky and on earth holds power over all beings, Ezana, son of Ella Amida, Bisi Halen, king of Aksum, Himyar, Raydan, Saba, Salhin, Tsiyamo, Beja and of Kasu, king of kings, son of Ella Amida, never defeated by the enemy.

May the might of the Lord of Heaven, who has made me king, who reigns for all eternity, invincible, cause that no enemy can resist me, that no enemy may follow me! By the might of the Lord of All, you campaigned against the Noba when the Noba peoples revolted and boasted. `They will not dare to cross the Takaze' said the Noba people. When they had oppressed the Mangurto, Hasa and Barya peoples, and when the blacks fought the red people and they broke their word for the second and third times and put their neighbors to death without mercy, and pillaged our messengers and the envoys whom I sent to them to admonish them, and they plundered them of what they had including their lances; when finally, having sent new messengers to whom they did not wish to listen but replied by refusals, scorn, and evil acts; then I took the field. I set forth by the might of the Lord of the Land and I fought at the Takaze and the ford Kemalke. Here I put them to flight, and, not resting, I followed those who fled for twenty-three days during which I killed some everywhere they halted. I made prisoners of others and took booty from them. At the same time, those of my people who were in the field brought back captives and booty.

At the same time, I burnt their villages, both those with walls of stone and those of straw. My people took their cereals, bronze, iron, and copper and overthrew the idols in their dwellings, as well as their corn and cotton, and threw them themselves into the river Seda (Blue Nile). Many lost their lives in the river, no-one knows the number. At the same time, my people pierced and sank their boats which carried a crowd of men and women. And I captured two notables who had come as spies, mounted on camels, by name Yesaka and Butala, and the chief Angabene. The following nobles were put to death: Danoko, Dagale, Anako, Haware. The soldiers had wounded Karkara, their priest, and took from him a necklace of silver and a golden box. Thus five nobles and a priest fell. I arrived at the Kasu, fought them and took the prisoner at the confluence of the rivers Seda and Takaze. And the day after my arrival I sent into the field the columns Mahaza, Hara, Damawa? Falha? and Sera? along the Seda going up to their cities with walls of stone and of straw; their cities with walls of stone are Alwa and Daro. And my troops killed and took prisoners and threw them into the water and they returned home safe and sound after terrifying their enemies and vanquishing them thanks to the power of the Lord of the Land.

Next, I sent the columns of Halen, Laken? Sabarat, Falha, and Sera along the Seda, going down towards the four towns of straw of the Noba and the town of Negus. The towns of the Kasu with walls of stone which the Noba had taken were Tabito(?), Fertoti; and the troops penetrated to the territory of the Red Noba and my peoples returned safely after taking prisoners and booty and killing by the might of the Lord of Heaven. And I erected a throne at the confluence of the rivers Seda and Takaze opposite the town with walls of stone which rises on this peninsula. And behold what the Lord of Heaven has given me; prisoners, 214 men, 415 women, total 629; killed, 602 men, 156 women and children, total 758, and adding the prisoners and killed 1,387. The booty came to 10,560 head of cattle and 51,050 sheep.

And I set up a throne here in Shado by the might of the Lord of Heaven who has helped me and given me supremacy. May the Lord of Heaven reinforce my reign. And, as he has now defeated my enemies for me, may he continue to do so wherever I go. As he has now conquered for me and has submitted my enemies to me, I wish to reign in justice and equity, without doing any injustice to my peoples.

And I put this throne which I have raised under the protection of the Lord of Heaven, who has made me king, and that of the Earth (Meder) which bears it. And if anyone is found to root it up, deface it or displace it, let him and his race be rooted up and extirpated. They shall be cast out of the country. And I have raised this throne by the power of the Lord of Heaven.

=== Sabaean translation ===
The Lord strong and brave, the Lord mighty in battle. By the power of the Lord and by the grace of Jesus Christ, the son of the Lord, the victorious, in whom I believe, who has given me a strong kingdom by which I dominate my enemies and trample underfoot the head of my adversaries, who has guarded me since infancy and established me on the throne of my fathers... I trust myself to Christ so that all my enterprises might succeed, and that I may be saved by him who pleases my soul? With the help of the Trinity, the Father, Son, and Holy Spirit.

Kaleb, Ella Atsbeha, son of Tazena, Be'ese LZN, king of Aksum, Himyar, Raydan, Saba, Salhen, and of the High Country and Yamanat, and the Coastal Plain and Hadramawt and of all their Arabs, and the Beja, Noba, Kasu, Siyamo and DRBT... of the land ATFY(?), servant of Christ, who is not defeated by the enemy.

With the help of the Lord I fought the Agwezat and HST. I fought them, having divided my troops... (here follow some troop names) my country and with... march day and night... kill... Agwezat... iniquity? and I sent the Atagaw and the (more troop names?) they killed the HST and I followed with... peace... refuge... by the might of the Lord... made captive... there, their country with their offerings... thousand... and the cattle which they had taken... return.... carry on the back... and the number killed of the Agwezat and the HST was men 400... women and children I... the total... captives, men, women, and children 4... total of the killed and captives was... and the booty of cattle... hundreds, camels 200. This the Lord gave me... make war... Himyar... I sent HYN SLBN ZSMR with my troops and I founded a maqdas (church) in Himyar... the name of the Son of God in whom I put my reliance.... I built his GBZ and consecrated it by the power of the Lord... and the Lord has revealed to me his holiness? and I shall remain on this throne... and I have set it under the tutelage of the Lord, creator of heaven and earth, against he who should destroy, pluck up, or break it. And he who would tear up or destroy it, let the Lord tear up....

== See also ==
- Hawulti (monument)
- King Ezana's Stele
- Obelisk of Axum
- Monumentum Adulitanum
