= Sofya of Axum =

Queen consort and regent of the Kingdom of Axum

Queen consort of Axum
- Tenure: c. early 320s – c. 330

Regent of Axum
- Tenure: 320s-330s

Queen Regnant of Ethiopia (traditional)
- Tenure: 299–306 (E.C.)
- Spouse: Ella Amida
- Issue: Ezana

Sofya (4th-century), was a queen consort and regent of the Kingdom of Axum.

== Historical background ==
She was married to king Ella Amida (Ousanas). She was widowed in c. 330, and her son, Ezana of Axum, succeeded her dead husband as king. As her son was still a child upon his succession, she ruled as regent during his minority.

== Alternate names ==
The 1922 regnal list of Ethiopia lists Sofya as a reigning monarch in her own right named "Ahywa Sofya", who ruled by herself from 299 to 306 (E.C.). This king list claims she was the mother of Abreha and Atsbeha, who are credited with introducing Christianity to Ethiopia. In reality it was Ezana who was the first Christian king of Axum and it has been suggested by some historians that he and his brother Saizana were the inspiration for the legend of Abreha and Atsbeha.

A monarch named "Ahywa" is named on some earlier regnal lists reigning directly before Abreha and Atsbeha. A manuscript held in the British Museum as well as a king list recorded by Egyptologist Henry Salt in 1814 both mention a monarch called "Ahywa" who reigned for 3 years. The same manuscript additionally claims that the mother of Abreha and Atsbeha was a woman named Eguala Anbasa, who may be the same woman as Sofya but under a different name.

According to an unpublished short history of kings from Axum the wife of Ella Amida was named "Ahiyewa", who reigned for three years during the minority of her sons, who were both put in the temple of Axum under the protection of the high priest. This suggests that the 3-year reign of "Ahywa" from the regnal lists refers to the regency of Sofya, although the 1922 regnal list extended this to seven years.

The queen is explicitly named Sofya in a book titled Gedle Abreha and Asbeha from the Church of Abreha wa-Atsbeha, where she is named as the wife of king Tazer and mother of Abreha and Atsbeha.
