= Abreha and Atsbeha =

Aksumite figures

Abreha and Atsbeha were brothers and Aksumite rulers who were said to have adopted Christianity in the 4th-century, although this claim is dubious. The story of Abreha and Atsbeha is lifted from that of the historical personages King Ezana and his brother Saizana. Stuart Munro-Hay has also speculated that the myth may have emerged from a confusion with two other religious Aksumite figures: Kaleb of Axum, whose throne name was Ella Atsbeha, and Abraha, an Aksumite general who promoted Christianity in Yemen.

According to tradition, Abreha and Atsbeha succeeded Ella Allada to the Aksumite throne. The missionary Frumentius, who had been captured during Ella Allada's reign, converted the brothers to Christianity following which the rest of the kingdom eventually converted. It is claimed they founded 44 churches.

== See also ==
- Christianity in Ethiopia
- Church of Abreha wa-Atsbeha
- Axum
- List of legendary monarchs of Ethiopia
