= Nelson Monument, Portsdown Hill =

Monument in Hampshire, England

Nelson Monument
- Interactive map of Nelson Monument
- Designer: John Thomas Groves
- Type: Stele
- Completion date: 1808
- Dedicated to: Horatio Nelson

The Nelson Monument, 120 feet (37 m) tall on a granite base, stands on Portsdown Hill about 2 miles (3.2 km) north of Portsmouth Harbour on the south coast of England. It was the eventual outcome of a movement started during Horatio Nelson's lifetime to "perpetuate the glorious victories of the British Navy". By 1799 Nelson's prize agent Alexander Davison was able to use the Nelson name to spearhead a campaign to honour "Britain's naval glory and pre-eminence". It was, however, Nelson's death at Trafalgar, 21 October 1805, that galvanized the campaign.

A design for the monument by John Thomas Groves of the Board of Works was exhibited at the Royal Academy in 1807, The monument is modelled on the Aksum Stele, Ethiopia: Groves was inspired by the findings in Aksum of Henry Salt who visited Ethiopia in 1805.

However, letters were written to The Times asking where the money Davison had raised had gone, but the £4050 he raised was never recovered. The final (and successful) attempt was paid for by the Navy itself. This time the fund's driving force, Captain Thomas Fremantle, adopted a more altruistic approach, and the monument commenced construction on 4 July 1807 with the final checks to the inscription made just over a year later. The monument was rebuilt in 1899, but the bust is the original. The monument still serves as a navigation mark, used in compass corrections.

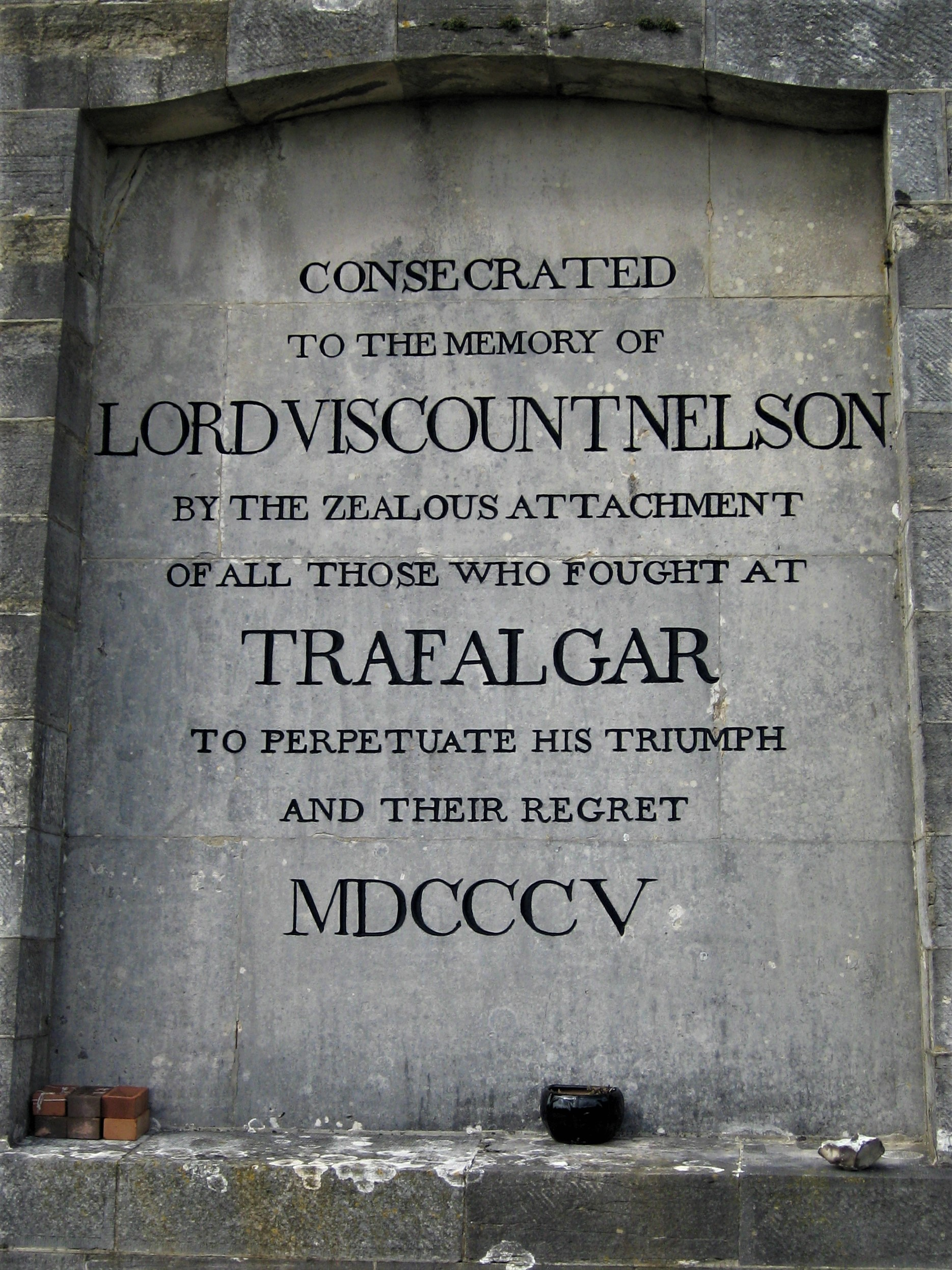
Dedication

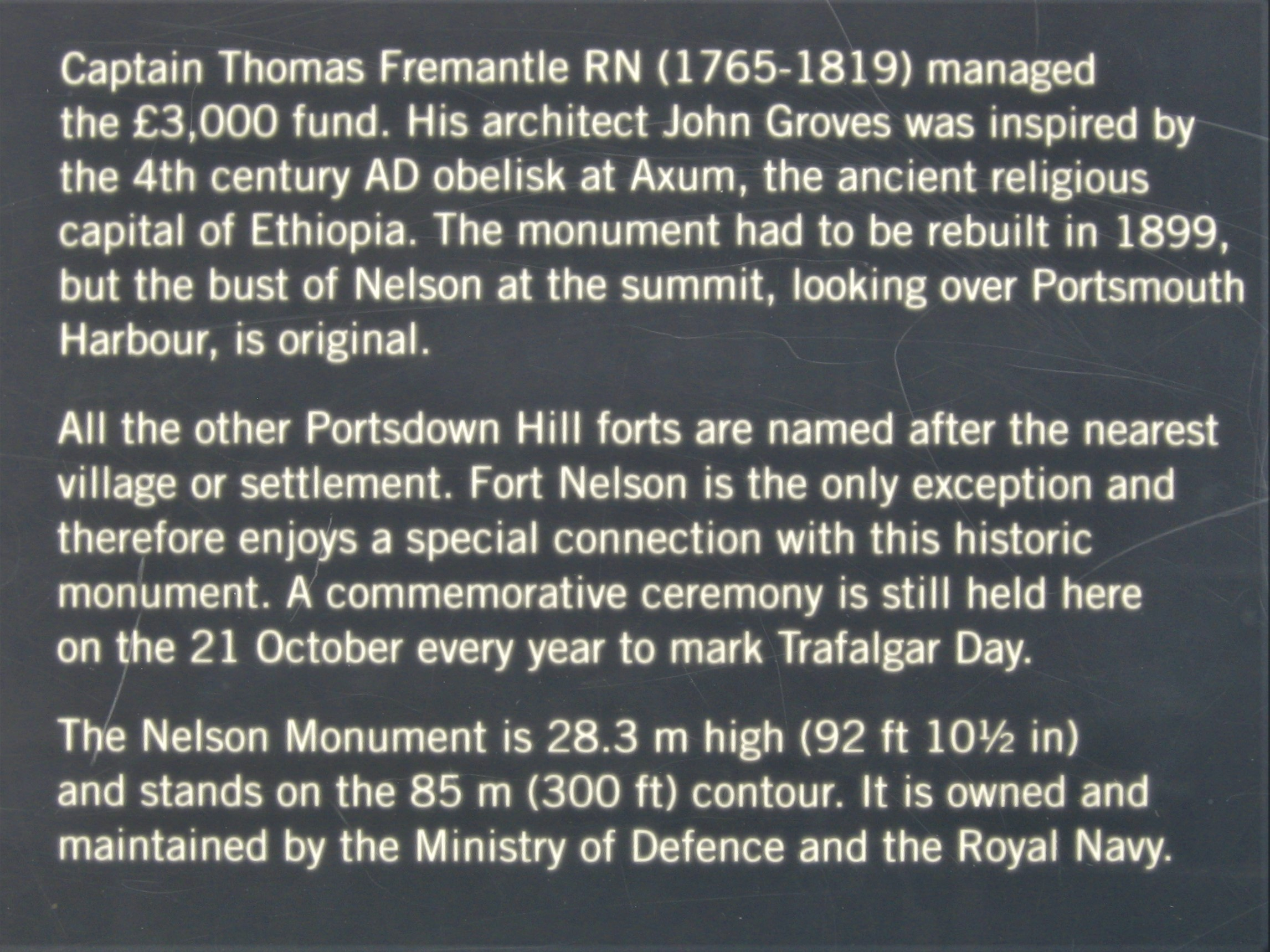
Information board

Summit, with bust of Nelson

Although very near the town of Fareham, the monument falls within the boundary of Winchester City Council. The adjacent Fort Nelson, Portsmouth, completed in 1871 as another Napoleon threatened England's south coast, is so named because of its proximity to the monument.

== Notes ==
50°51′38″N 1°08′03″W
