= Saizana =

Brother of Ezana of Axum

Saizana (unvocalized Ge'ez: ሠዐዘነ śʿzn) (c. 360 AD) was the brother of King Ezana of Axum, who changed the official religion of the Axumite Kingdom to Christianity. That kingdom abutted the Red Sea and covers part of modern-day Djibouti, Sudan, Yemen and Saudi Arabia. His father was King Ousanas. His mother was Queen Sofya of Axum, who ruled as regent until King Ezana was of age.

According to the historian Tyrannius Rufinus, he was converted to Christianity with his brother Ezana by the missionary Frumentius. With his brother, he resisted the attempts of the Christian Roman emperor Constantius II to relieve Frumentius of his post as bishop and replace him with an Arian (which was a different sect of Christianity).

He was a general in his brother’s army and also co-ruled with him for a short time.

Saizana was sent by King Ezana with his other brother Hadefa (alternatively spelled Adiphan, Adefa) to quell an uprising by the Beja. The two brothers were victorious, and six Beja tribes (4400 people) were relocated to a province called Matlia, which is believed to have been situated similarly to the modern province of Begemder in Ethiopia.

He is considered a saint by the Coptic Church. His feast day is October 1. He is also acknowledged as a saint in the Roman Catholic Church and Eastern Orthodox Church.

== See also ==
Ezana Stone
