= Theophilos the Indian =

Roman bishop (d. 364 CE)

Orders
- Rank: Bishop

Personal details
- Born: Theopholis
- Died: 364

Theophilos the Indian, also known as Theophilus Indus (Greek: Θεόφιλος) (died 364), also called "the Ethiopian", was an Aetian or Heteroousian bishop who fell alternately in and out of favor with the court of the Roman emperor Constantius II. He is mentioned in the encyclopedia Suda.

He came from an island in the Indian Ocean, which has been identified as Socotra, the island Divus which could be the Maldive Islands, or an island at the mouth of the Indus. Theophilos came to the court of Constantine I as a young man and was ordained a deacon under the Arian bishop Eusebius of Nicomedia. He was later exiled because Constantius believed him to be a supporter of Constantius' rebellious cousin Gallus. Famed for his ability as a healer, Theophilus was later recalled to court to heal Constantius' wife, the empress Eusebia, which he is reputed to have done successfully. He was exiled again for his support of the disfavored theologian Aëtius whose Anomoean doctrine was an offshoot of Arianism.

Theophilus was ordained a bishop and around 354 AD, Emperor Constantius II sent Theophilus on a mission to south Asia via Arabia, where he is said to have converted the Himyarites and built three churches in southwest Arabia. He is also said to have found Christians in India. In about 356, the Emperor Constantius II wrote to Ezana of the Kingdom of Aksum requesting him to replace the then Bishop of Aksum Frumentius with Theophilos, who supported the Arian position, as did the Emperor. This request was ultimately turned down.

On his return to the empire he settled at Antioch.

One of the churches which Theophilus had founded in Arabia during the 4th century was built at Zafar, Yemen and likely destroyed in 523 by the King of Himyar Dhu Nuwas, who had shifted the state religion from Christianity to Judaism. Later in 525, Theophilus' church was restored by the Christian King Kaleb of Axum following his successful invasion on Himyar.
