= Ezana of Axum =

4th-century ruler of the Kingdom of Aksum

Ezana
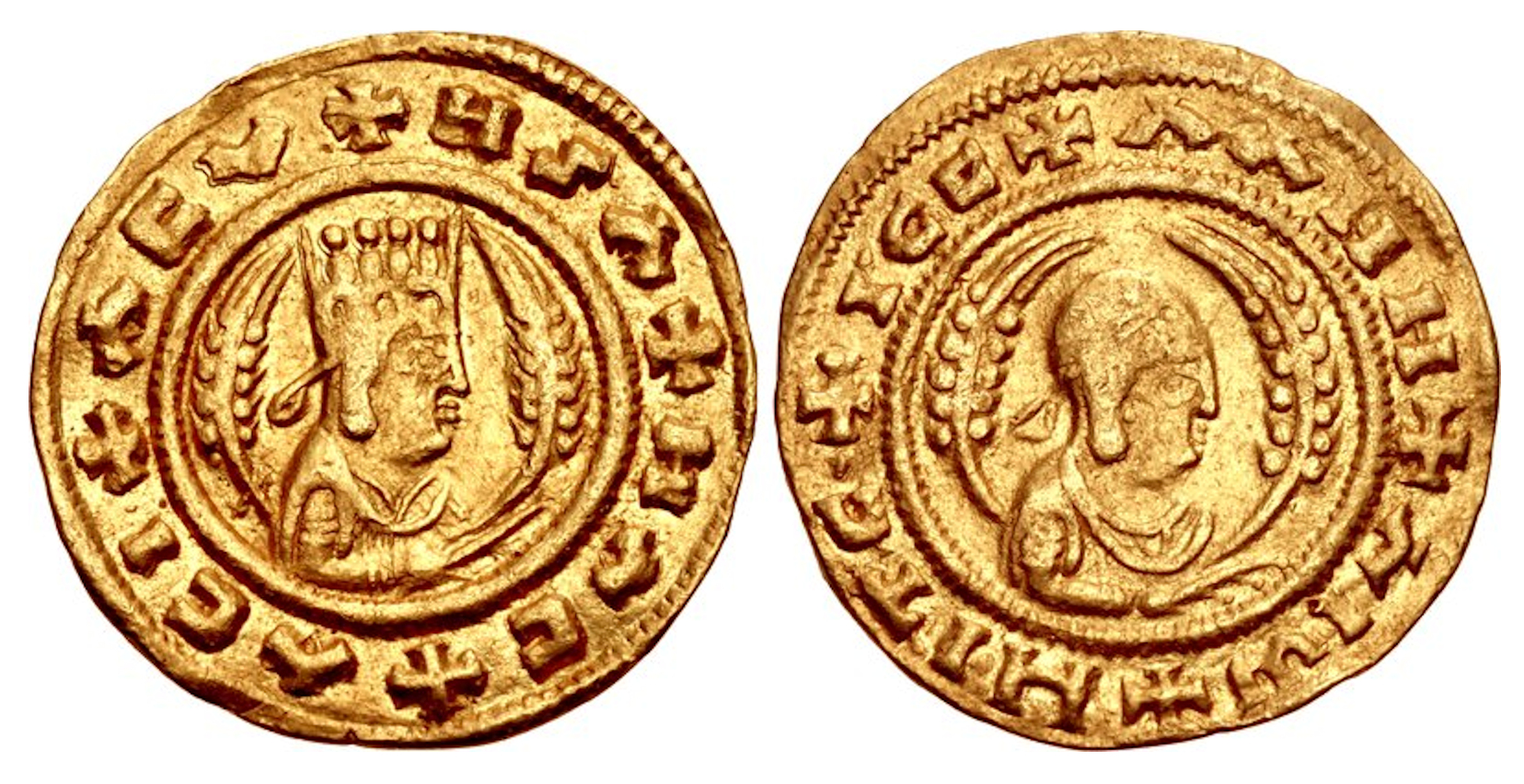
- Gold coin of Ezana of Axum

King of Axum
- Reign: 320s – c. 360 AD
- Predecessor: Ousanas
- Successor: MHDYS
- Religion: Ancient Semitic religion (before 320); Oriental Orthodoxy (after 320)

Saint Ezana (Aizan)

King
- Venerated in: Catholic Church; Eastern Orthodox Church; Ethiopian Orthodox Tewahedo Church Eritrean Orthodox Tewahedo Church
- Feast: 1 October and 27 October

Ezana (vocalized Ge'ez: ዔዛና, romanized: ‘Ezana, unvocalized ዐዘነ, ‘zn); Ancient Greek: Ἠεζάνα, Aezana) was the ruler of the Kingdom of Aksum (320s – c. 360 AD). One of the best-documented rulers of Aksum, Ezana is important as the one who adopted both the religion of Christianity and the name of Ethiopia for that country when he conquered Aethiopia (Referring to the Kingdom of Kush, not to be confused with modern day Ethiopia). Tradition states that Ezana succeeded his father Ella Amida (Ousanas) as king while still a child; his mother, Sofya, served as regent until he came of age.

== Reign ==
Ezana was the first monarch of the Kingdom of Aksum to embrace Coptic Christianity, after his Phoenician slave-teacher, Frumentius, converted him. He was the first monarch after Zoskales to be mentioned by contemporary historians, a situation that lead Stuart Munro-Hay to comment that he was "the most famous of the Aksumite kings before Kaleb." In early life he considered himself a son of Ares, but later inscriptions show a growing attachment to Christianity. His childhood tutor, the Syrian Christian Frumentius, became head of the Ethiopian Church. A surviving letter from the Arian Roman emperor Constantius II is addressed to ‘Ezana and his brother Saizana and requests that Frumentius be sent to Alexandria to be examined for doctrinal errors and be replaced by Theophilos the Indian; Munro-Hay assumes that ‘Ezana either refused or ignored this request.

Ezana also launched several military campaigns, which he recorded in his inscriptions. A pair of inscriptions on a stela in Ge'ez found at Meroë is thought of as evidence of a campaign in the fourth century, either during Ezana's reign, or by a predecessor like Ousanas. While some authorities interpret these inscriptions as proof that the Aksumites destroyed the kingdom of Meroë, others say that archaeological evidence points to an economic and political decline in Meroë around 300. Moreover, some view the stela as military aid from Axum to Meroë to quell the revolt and rebellion by the Nuba. However, conclusive evidence and proof as to which view is correct is not currently available.

On some of the Aksumite coins minted during ‘Ezana's reign appears the motto in Greek ΤΟΥΤΟ ΑΡΕΣΗ ΤΗ ΧΩΡΑ – "May this please the country". Munro-Hay comments that this motto is "a rather attractive peculiarity of Aksumite coinage, giving a feeling of royal concern and responsibility towards the people's wishes and contentment". A number of coins minted bearing his name were found in the late 1990s at archaeological sites in India, indicating trade contacts in that country. A remarkable feature of the coins is a shift from a pagan motif with disc and crescent to a design with a cross. ‘Ezana is also credited for erecting several stelae and obelisks. An inscription in Greek gives the regnal claims of Ezana:

I, Ezana, King of the Kingdom of Aksum and Himyarites and of Reeidan and of the Ethiopians and of the Sabaites and of Sileel (?) and of Hasa and of the Bougaites and of Taimo...

— Greek inscription of Ezana.

Ezana is unknown in the King Lists even though the coins bear this name. According to tradition, Emperors Abreha and Asbeha ruled Ethiopia when Christianity was introduced. It may be that these names were later applied to ‘Ezana and his brother or that these were their baptismal names.

== Veneration ==
Along with his brother, Saizana (Sazan), Ezana (Aizan) is regarded as a saint by the Ethiopian Orthodox Tewahedo Church and Catholic Church, with a feast day of the first of October and on 27 October.

== See also ==
- Ezana Stone
