= Hawulti (monument) =

Pre-Aksumite obelisk in Matara, Eritrea

- ሓወልቲ
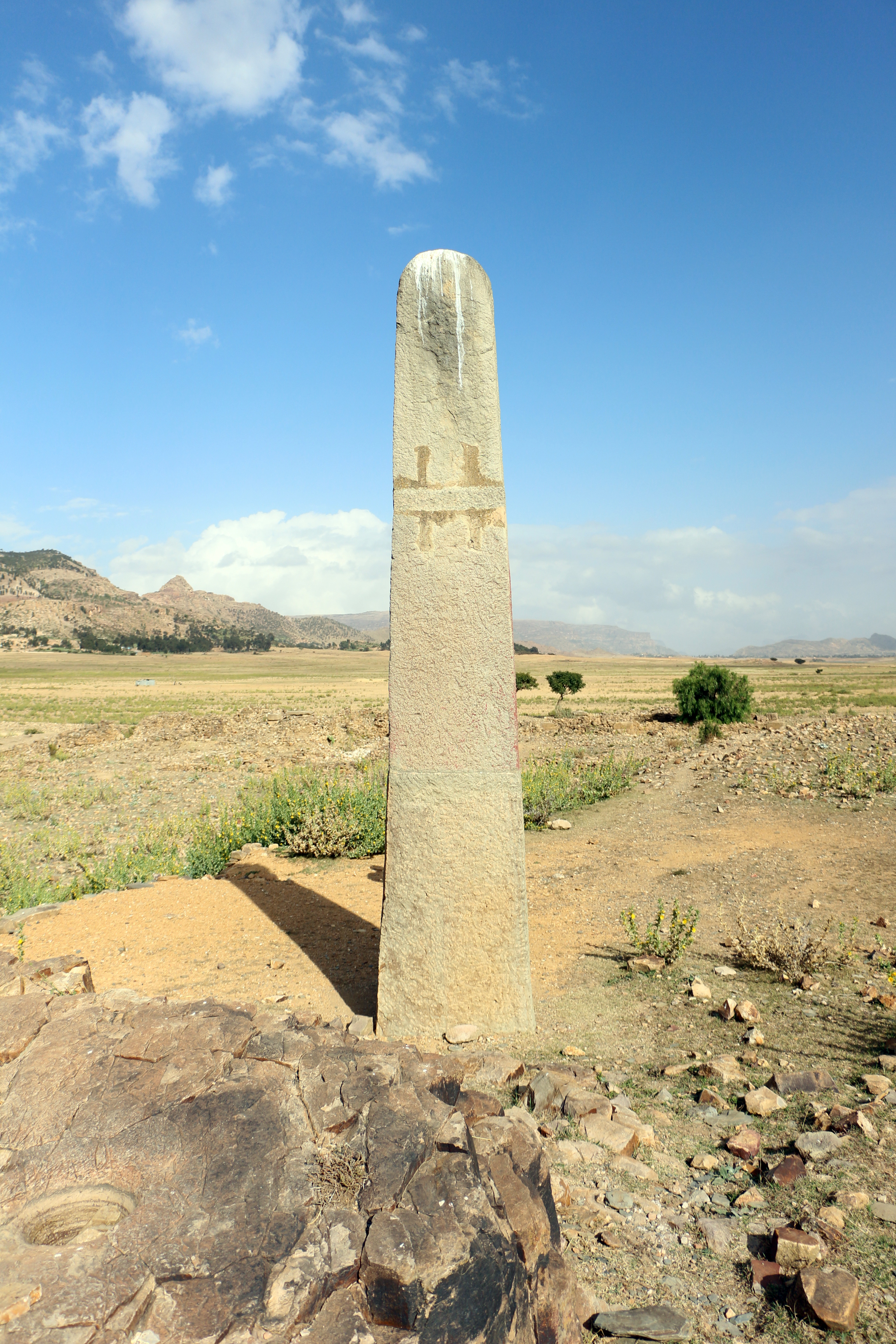
- Hawulti, a pre-Aksumite stele
- Interactive map of Hawulti
- Location: Matara, Eritrea
- Coordinates: 14°40′27″N 39°25′30″E
- Type: pre-Aksumite stele

Hawulti (Tigrinya: ሓወልቲ) is a pre-Aksumite obelisk located in Matara, Eritrea. The monument bears the oldest known example of the ancient Geʽez script.

== Description ==
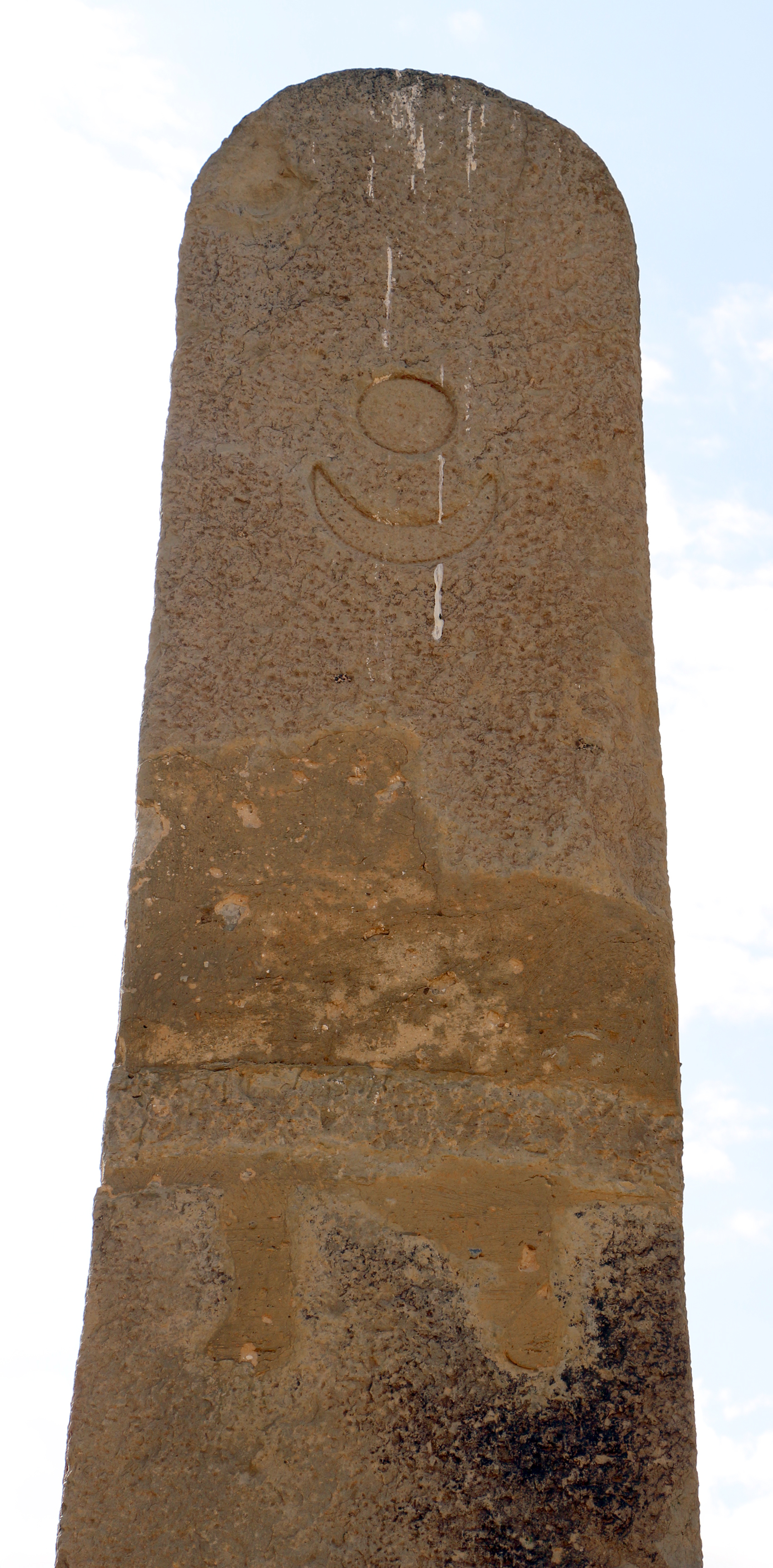
Sun and crescent emblems.

The Hawulti monument is 5.5 metres (18 ft) high, with a disk and crescent at the top; Edward Ullendorff believes these symbols "no doubt meant to place the stele under the protection of the gods, probably of Šams, the Sun goddess, and of Sin, the Moon god". These pre-Christian symbols, as well as paleographical characteristics such as the lack of vowel marks in the Geʽez script, convinced Ullendorff that the monument dated "to the early part of the fourth century A.D."

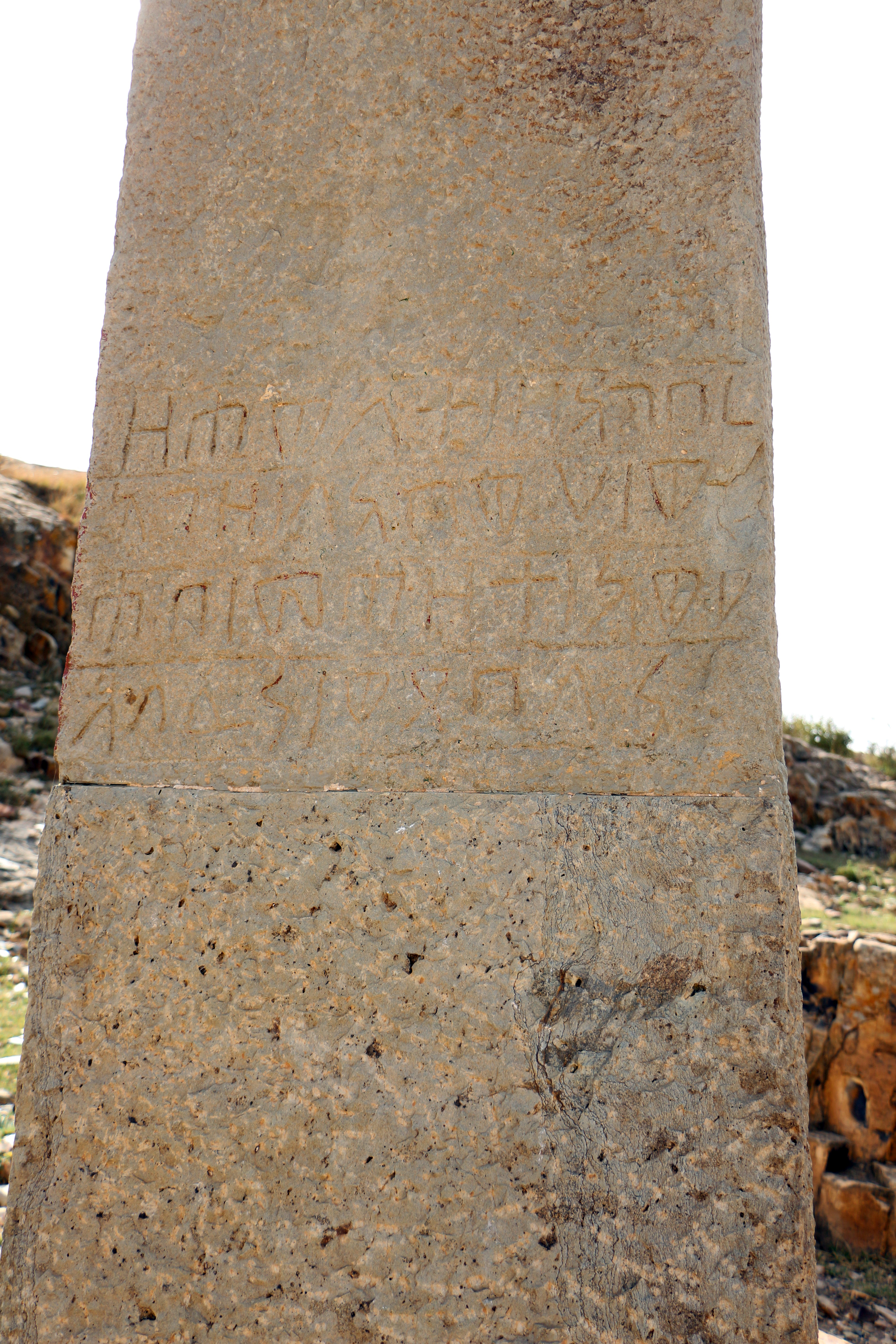
Inscription.

Ullendorff translated the inscription as follows:

This is the obelisk which had (caus) made
ʾAgaz for his fathers who have
carried off the youth of ʾwʿ
ʾlf as well as of ṣbl.

His translation differs from Enno Littmann at several points. First, Littmann believed the third line referred to the digging of canals nearby (his translation, "zog die Kannaele von ʾAwʿa") despite the lack of any signs of canals or ditches in the area; Ullendorff argues that the triliteral verb s-ḥ-b in the inscription should be translated as "to drag along, to capture". Second, he believed the nouns ʾwʿ, ʾlf, and ṣbl were placenames, and based on discussions with local informants, Ullendorff identified them with nearby communities: the earlier name of Baraknaha, the site of a 12th-century Orthodox Tewahedo church 17 kilometres (11 mi) from Maṭara in Eritrea, had been Ṣubli, and the equally well-known church at Gunda Gunde Monastery, 22 knots (41 km/h; 25 mph) from Maṭara, had once been known as ʾAwʿa ʾilfi.

== Modern history ==
When Littmann, leader of the Deutsche Aksum-Expedition, found the Hawulti, it had been pushed over and broken in half in the distant past. The Italian colonial government had the broken monument repaired with two iron bars and set upright in what was thought to be its proper position, but was not accurate.

The Hawulti was toppled and damaged by Ethiopian troops in the short occupation of southern Eritrea during the Eritrean–Ethiopian War. It has since been repaired by the National Museum of Eritrea.

== See also ==
- Ezana Stone
- King Ezana's Stele
- Monolithic architecture
- Yeha
