= Church of Abreha wa-Atsbeha =

Church in Ethiopia

Coordinates: 13.8471°N 39.5370°E

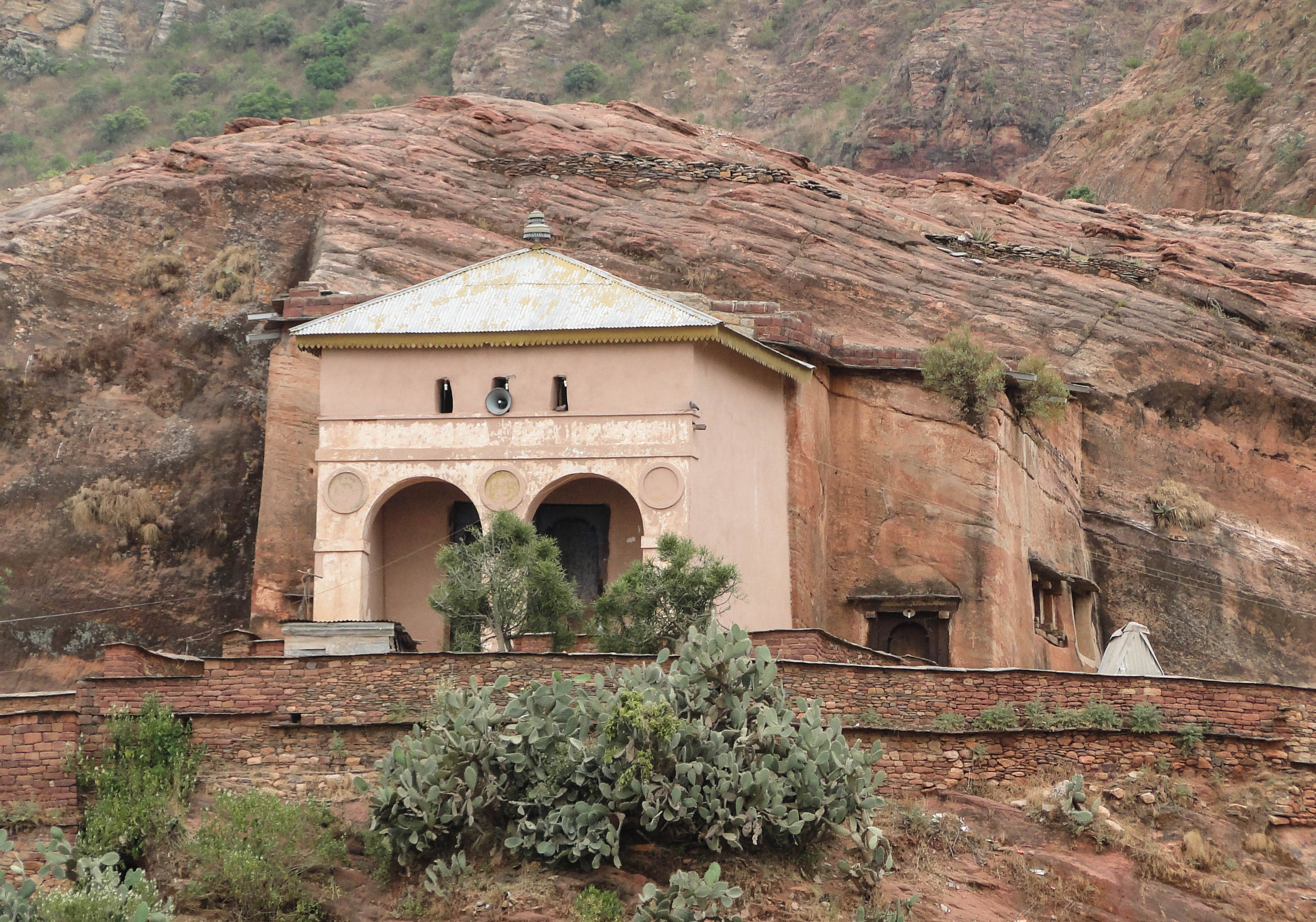
Exterior of the church

The Church of Abreha wa-Atsbeha (sometimes spelt Abreha we Atsbeha) was built in East Tigray, around 15 km from Wukro, in the 4th century by Abreha and Atsbeha. Their bodies are claimed to be entombed in the church. At one time the church served as a monastery but now operates as a parish church. Paul B. Henze visited the church in the 1970s where he was told the ceiling was blackened by soot due to Queen Gudit setting a fire in the building nine centuries earlier.
