= Frumentius =

Phoenician Christian missionary; the first bishop of Axumite Empire

Saint Frumentius
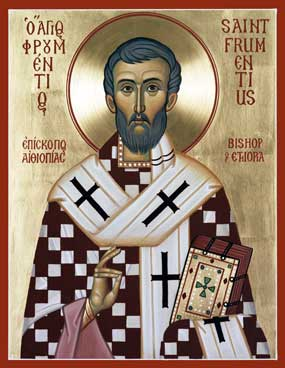
- Saint Frumentius

Confessor Bishop of Axum Apostle to Agazit
- Born: 4th century Tyre, Phoenice, Roman Empire (modern-day Lebanon)
- Died: c. 383; Kingdom of Aksum
- Venerated in: Eastern Orthodox Church; Oriental Orthodoxy; Catholicism; Anglican Communion
- Feast: 27 December (Ethiopian Orthodox Church); 20 July (Catholic Church); 27 October (older traditional Latin); 30 November (Eastern Orthodox Church); 18 December (Coptic Orthodox Church)
- Patronage: Kingdom of Aksum

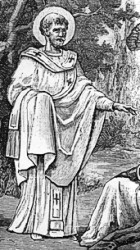
Frumentius

Frumentius (vocalized Ge'ez: ፍሬምናጦስ, romanized: Fremnaṭos; Latin: Sanctus Frumentius; Ancient Greek: Φρουμέντιος, romanized: Frouméntios; died c. 383) was a Phoenician Christian missionary and the first bishop of Axum who brought Christianity to the Kingdom of Aksum. He is sometimes known by other names, such as Abuna ("Our Father") and Aba Selama ("Father of Peace").

He was a native of Phoenicia, born in Tyre, modern day Lebanon. As a boy, he was captured with his brother on a voyage, and they became slaves to the King of Axum. He freed them shortly before his death, and they were invited to educate his young heir. They also began to teach Christianity in the region. Later, Frumentius traveled to Alexandria, Egypt, where he appealed to have a bishop appointed and missionary priests sent south to Axum. Thereafter, he was appointed bishop and established the Church in Ethiopia, converting many local people, as well as the king. His appointment began a tradition that the Patriarch of Alexandria appoint the bishops of Ethiopia.

== Biography ==
According to the fourth-century historian Tyrannius Rufinus (x.9), who cites Frumentius' brother Edesius as his authority, as children (ca. 316) Frumentius and Edesius accompanied their uncle Meropius from their birthplace of Tyre (now in Lebanon) on a voyage to 'India'. When their ship stopped at one of the harbors of the Red Sea on their return voyage, local people massacred the whole crew, sparing the two boys, who were taken as slaves to the King of Axum. Edesius was made a cupbearer and Frumentius, his secretary and treasurer. Shortly before his death, the king freed them. The widowed queen, however, prevailed upon them to remain at the court and assist her in the education of the young heir, Ezana, and in the administration of the kingdom during the prince's minority. They remained and (especially Frumentius) used their influence to spread Christianity. First they encouraged the Christian merchants present in the country to practice their faith openly, and they helped them find places "where they could come together for prayer according to the Roman Rite"; later they converted some of the natives.

When the prince came of age, Edesius returned to Tyre, where he stayed and was ordained a priest. Frumentius, eager for the conversion of Ethiopia, accompanied his brother as far as Alexandria, where he requested Athanasius, Patriarch of Alexandria, to send a bishop and some priests as missionaries to Ethiopia. By Athanasius' own account, he believed Frumentius to be the most suitable person for the job. He consecrated him as bishop, traditionally in the year 328, or according to others, between 340 and 346.

Frumentius returned to Ethiopia, where he erected his episcopal see at Axum, then converted and baptized King Ezana, who built many churches and spread Christianity throughout Ethiopia. Frumentius established the first monastery of Ethiopia, called Dabba Selama in Dogu'a Tembien. The people called Frumentius Kesate Birhan "Revealer of Light" and Abba Salama "Father of Peace". He became the first Abuna, a title given to the head of the Oriental Orthodox Churches in Ethiopia.

In about 356, the Roman emperor Constantius II wrote to King Ezana and his brother Saizana, requesting them to replace Frumentius as bishop with Theophilos the Indian, who supported Arianism, as did the emperor. Athanasius, a leading opponent of Arianism, had appointed Frumentius. The king refused the request.

Ethiopian traditions credit him with the first Geʽez translation of the New Testament and being involved in the development of Geʽez script from an abjad (consonantal-only) into an abugida (syllabic).

== Feast date ==
The Ethiopian and Eritrean Orthodox Tewahedo Churches celebrate his consecration on 18 Taḫśaś (the 4th month of the Ethiopian calendar and death in 26 Hamle (the 11th month).

The Coptic Orthodox Church celebrates the feast of Frumentius on 18 December, the Eastern Orthodox Church on 30 November and the Catholic Church on 20 July.

== Patronage ==
Frumentius is regarded as the patron saint of the former Kingdom of Aksum, and its contemporary territories.

He is the patron saint of St Frumentius Theological College in Ethiopia, which is part of the Episcopal/Anglican Province of Alexandria.

== See also ==
- 4th century in Lebanon

== Sources ==
- Martyrologium Romanum, Editio Altera (Citta del Vaticano: Libreria Editrice Vaticana, 2004), p. 401
