= Ethiopian manuscript collections =

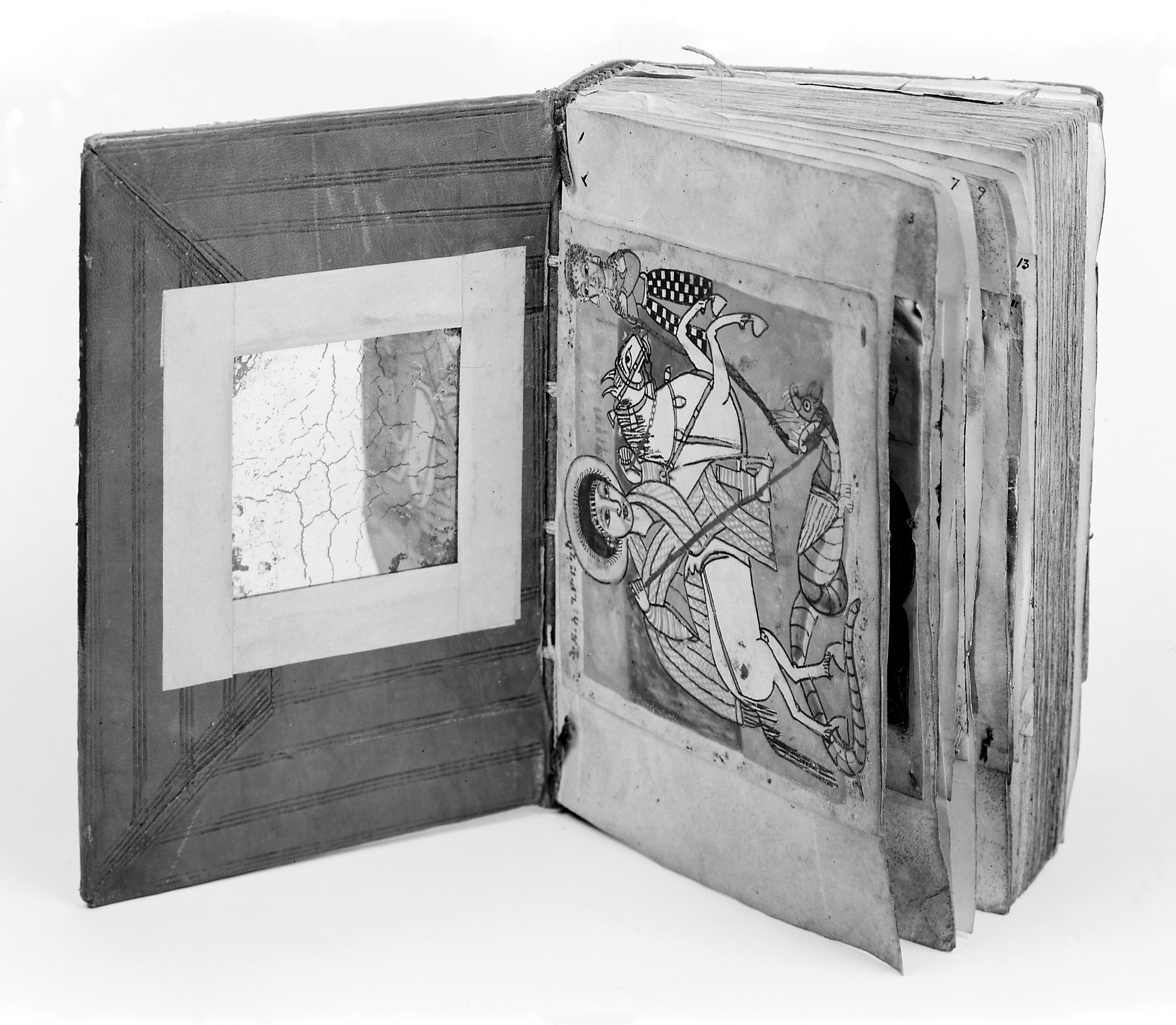
Bible of Tewodros II. First page showing mirror inside front cover with an illustration of Saint George. Written on vellum, tooled leather binding, 8 volumes. Wellcome Library, London, number 62892.

Ethiopian manuscript collections are found in many parts of the world, the monasteries and modern institutions in Ethiopia maintaining extensive collections with some monasteries still centres of manuscript production.

Parchment (berānnā) was used for Ethiopian manuscripts from the time of the Four Gospel books of Abbā Garimā, generally known as the Garima Gospels, preserved in the Abba Garima Monastery. These gospels are thought to be the oldest surviving Christian illuminated manuscripts, with their dating established by C-14 analysis. Apart from Islamic manuscripts, paper only came into general use in the twentieth century.

There are 88 languages in Ethiopia according to Ethnologue, but not all support manuscript cultures. The majority of manuscripts are in Ge'ez, the ancient liturgical language of Ethiopia.

Catalogues and Online Resources. Catalogues of individual collections were written in the nineteenth century, with a key work for the disposition of Ethiopian MSS more widely prepared in 1995 and published by Robert Beylot and Maxime Rodinson. Since that time, there have been several disparate initiatives, for example, Inventory of Libraries and Catalogues of Ethiopian Manuscripts, hosted by MÉNESTREL. More stable and ambitious is Beta maṣāḥǝft: Manuscripts of Ethiopia and Eritrea (Schriftkultur des christlichen Äthiopiens und Eritreas: eine multimediale Forschungsumgebung), a project hosted by the Hiob Ludolf Centre for Ethiopian and Eritrean Studies at the Universität Hamburg.

The list of institutions below is a partial selection of the most prominent and best known collections, giving special attention to the individual researchers involved in forming the collections and those scholars who wrote the catalogues.

== Ethiopian collections in Ethiopia ==
Thousands of monasteries and churches in Ethiopia have manuscript collections that are not listed here. Below are some of the important ones.

=== Gunda Gunde Monastery, Tigray Region ===
The Gunda Gunde Monastery is located in the Misraqawi (Eastern) Zone of the northern Tigray Region in Ethiopia. It is known for its prolific scriptorium, and library of Ge'ez manuscripts. This collection of over 220 volumes, all but one dating from before the 16th century, is one of the largest collections of its kind in Ethiopia. The Gunda Gunde Manuscript Project, based at the University of Toronto, seeks to preserve a digitized manuscript collection of the monastery's holdings.

=== Institute of Ethiopian Studies, Addis Ababa ===
The Institute of Ethiopian Studies in Addis Ababa has a collection of approximately 1500 manuscripts, still largely uncatalogued as of 2012. However a team led by Alessandro Gori undertook a listing exercise with regard to the Arabic materials and published the results in 2014.

=== National Archives and Library of Ethiopia, Addis Ababa ===
National Archives and Library of Ethiopia has a collection of approximately 835 manuscripts, at present largely uncatalogued.

=== Debre Libanos Monastery ===
Since 2016, the Debre Libanos Monastery holds Tweed MS150 from Howard University.

== European collections of Ethiopian Manuscripts ==
Ethiopian manuscripts are known to have reached Europe as early as the fifteenth century, perhaps even earlier, through Egypt, Ethiopian pilgrims to the Holy Land and through members of the Ethiopian monastery of St Stephen of the Abyssinians in Rome. Subsequently, travellers, missionaries, military personnel and scholars contributed to the development of collections outside Ethiopia. In Europe, the three biggest collections of Ethiopian manuscripts are in Rome (Biblioteca Apostolica Vaticana), in Paris (Bibliothèque nationale de France) and in London (British Library). These three organisations together hold about 2,700 manuscripts. Oriental collections of nearly all significant European libraries also have Ethiopian material, with some still pursuing a policy of acquisition.

=== Accademia dei Lincei, Rome ===
The Accademia dei Lincei in Rome holds the collection of 138 manuscripts formed by Carlo Conti Rossini. The catalogue prepared by Stefan Strelcyn includes 30 further manuscripts in the Fonds Caetani. The oldest manuscripts in the collections date to the fifteenth century with some having a provenance of Debre Damo.

=== Bibliothèque nationale de France, Paris ===
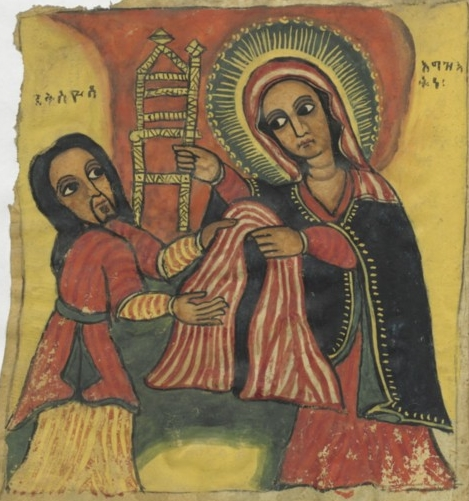
Miracle de Notre Dame and Saint Ildefonso, Bibliothèque nationale de France, Ethiopien 60 fol. 7v

The collections in the Bibliothèque nationale de France, held primarily in the Département des Manuscrits, have been subject to several cataloguing campaigns. In 1877 a catalogue was published by Hermann Zotenberg and gave an account of the 170 manuscripts then in the collection. The Ethiopic holdings were subsequently enlarged by the three collections, those of d'Abbadie, Casimir Mondon-Vidailhet, and Marcel Griaule which increased the number at BnF to more than 970 manuscripts. Zotenberg's work was accordingly followed by a catalogue of the Mondon-Vidailhet collection prepared by M. Chaine. The Griaule collection was published by Stefan Strelcyn. The BnF has the largest single collection of magico-medical scrolls in France, with over 160 specimens in the Griaule collection.

The Bibliothèque nationale de France has now digitized and provided freely online its collection at Gallica (e.g., the Chronicle of the Kings of Ethiopia).

=== Bodleian Library, Oxford ===
The early collections in the Bodleian Library at Oxford University came from James Bruce, and consisted of 25 Ethiopic manuscripts purchased by the library in 1843. The collection soon grew to 33 manuscripts and these were catalogued and published in 1848 by August Dillmann. Since the mid-nineteenth century the collection has expanded to 130 items. A notable addition in 2002 was an illustrated seventeenth-century manuscript of a Marian text, Arganona Weddase (‘Harp of Praise’) (MS. Aeth.e.28). The uncatalogued manuscripts were revisited in 2007 by Steve Delamarter and Damaqa Berhāna Tafarā.

=== British Library, London ===
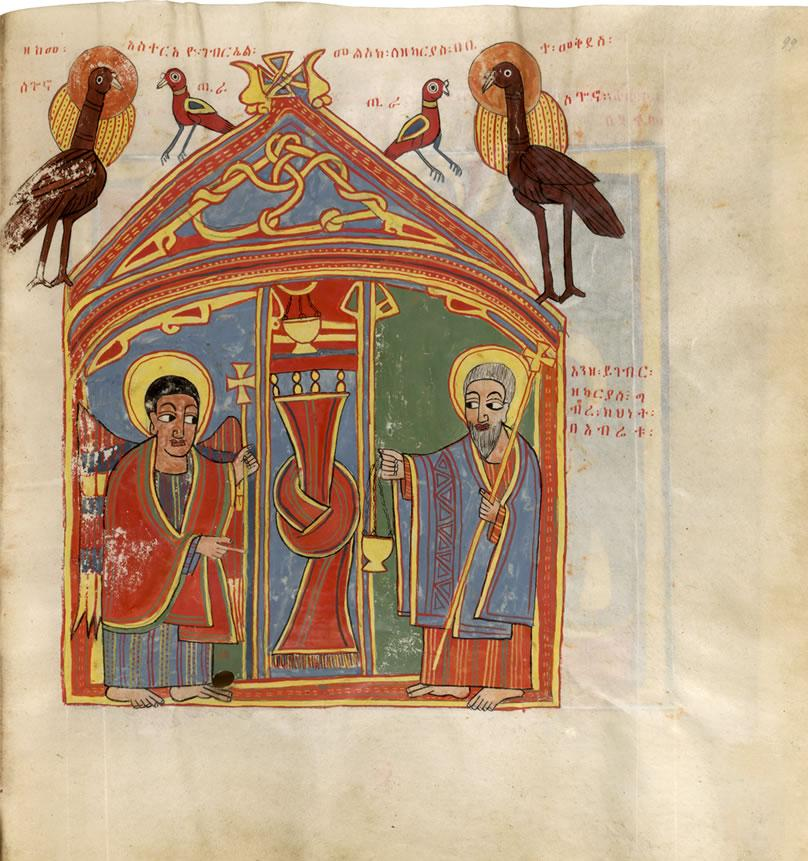
Folio from an illustrated Bible, Annunciation to Zechariah, British Library Add MS 59874.

The founding Ethiopic collections in the British Museum until 1973 and since then in the British Library—74 manuscripts—came from the Church Mission Society and the materials that had been assembled by Karl Wilhelm Isenberg and Johann Ludwig Krapf, missionaries and linguists who travelled to the country between 1839 and 1842. However, some of the collection has an earlier provenance, for example, Extracts from the Chronicle of Axum, written on paper in about 1810 with the book plate of George Annesley, 2nd Earl of Mountnorris. In 1847 the Trustees of the British Museum published a catalogue of the Ethiopian manuscripts that were then under their care. This catalogue was prepared by August Dillmann and included 88 items.

The British Museum collections grew in 1868 when 349 manuscripts came after the British Expedition to Abyssinia against emperor Tewodros II. A catalogue of the enlarged collection was prepared by William Wright and published in 1877. Nine decades later, Stefan Strelcyn reviewed the manuscripts that had come to the British Library after 1877 and published a catalogue of them. The catalogue lists 108 items (some with multiple parts) and covers the general range of Ethiopian literature from Biblical texts to magical and divinatory writings.

The transfer of the India Office collection to the British Library in 1982 brought 6 further manuscripts to the collection, first acquired in 1842 by the India Museum in East India House.

A further collection of 39 manuscripts came to the British Library from Roger Wenman Cowley (1940-1988). Cowley spent 15 years in Ethiopia as an Anglican missionary and teacher, during which time he assembled a collection of Biblical commentaries in Amharic. His MSS consist of copies on paper commissioned by Cowley and executed during the years 1967-77 (except for numbers 19-61, 32, 37, 40-42 and 44 which are copies made at different times in the twentieth century). Cowley used this material in his book Ethiopian Biblical Interpretation, published in 1988.

The British Library is in the process of digitizing and providing its Ethiopian manuscripts online in its Digitzed Manuscripts area (e.g., seventeen of its Täˀammərä Maryam are now online).

=== Cadbury Research Library, Birmingham ===
The Cadbury Research Library at the University of Birmingham has an extensive collection of about 3000 manuscripts, assembled in the 1920s by Alphonse Mingana. The collection includes four Ethiopic manuscripts and a scroll.

=== Cambridge University Library, Cambridge ===
The Ethiopic collections at the Cambridge University Library, just under seventy items in total, were catalogued by Edward Ullendorff. The uncatalogued manuscripts were revisited in 2007 by Steve Delamarter and Damaqa Berhāna Tafarā. The University of Cambridge has also established a digital library which contains samples from the collections, the oldest of which dates to the 14th century. This collection includes Cyril, ቄርሎስ, Qērellos (Add. 1569) from Trinity College, Cambridge. One item of note is manuscript (Ms Dd.11.38), notes made by Johann Michael Wansleben, otherwise known as Johann Michael Vansleb, during a stay in England in 1661–1662. This contains extracts from several texts, a list of over 700 proper names in Ge'ez and copies of correspondence that shed light on the study of Ethiopian texts in the seventeenth century.

=== Chester Beatty Library, Dublin ===
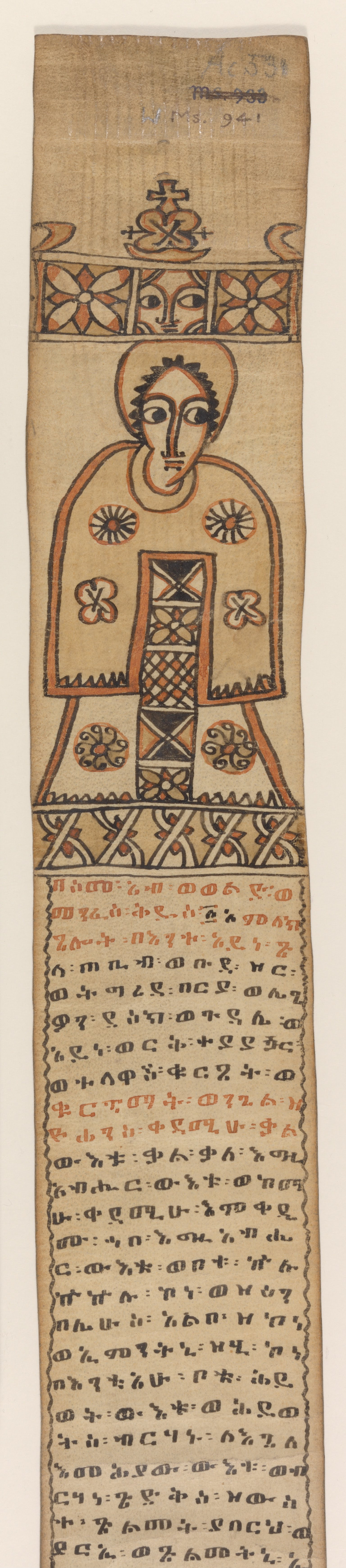
Scroll containing magical prayers to protect against evil in Geʽez. 19th century. Chester Beatty Library

The Chester Beatty collection of 58 Ethiopian manuscripts includes illustrated gospel books, psalters and devotional works. Chester Beatty purchased some of the collection at auction in London in the 1930s and bought the rest in the 1950s and later. The manuscripts were studied and published by Cerulli in 1965.

=== Edinburgh University Library, Edinburgh ===
The Edinburgh University Library has a small collection of Ethiopic manuscripts acquired from a variety of sources. These are as follows: Or. MS 461-462 Acts of St. George according to Theodotus of Ancyra, with 20 illustrations, between boards; Or. MS 477, Or. MS 644, Or. MS 649, Or. MS 651, Or. MS 654, Or. MS 655 Psalms, Or. MS 656, Psalms, Or. MS 673 Gospels, portion (?), scroll format.

=== John Rylands Library, Manchester ===
The John Rylands Library owns 45 items on parchment and paper, dating from the 1600s and later. The majority (31 items) came to the library from the Crawford collection, purchased in 1901. In addition to a copy of the Fetha Nagast (Ge'ez: ፍትሐ ነገሥት) (Ethiopian MS 13) and a deed of Dawit III (Ethiopian MS 28), the collection includes a number of magic scrolls (Ethiopian MSS 29-34).

The first catalogue of the collection was prepared by Stefan Strelcyn and published in 1974. The manuscripts were revisited and published in 2007 by Steve Delamarter and Damaqa Berhāna Tafarā.

=== Leiden University Library ===
The library at Leiden University has a collection of about 250 manuscripts in Ge’ez and Amharic mostly dating to the twentieth century. However, the first two Ethiopic manuscripts (Or. 262, Or. 4734) came to the library in the seventeeth century thanks to the bequest of Joseph Justus Scaliger (1540-1609). Subsequent acquisitions are listed in Catalogus van de Ethiopische handschriften, an inventory prepared by Rachel Struyk in 1995.

=== Schøyen Collection, Oslo ===
The Schøyen Collection of Ethiopian material was studied and published by David Appleyard.

=== Vatican Library ===
The Vatican Library has the largest collection of Ethiopian manuscripts outside of Ethiopia, many donated in the early modern period. In addition, in the 1990s, private collections of considerable size have been published and acquired by the Vatican Library.

=== Wellcome Collection, London ===
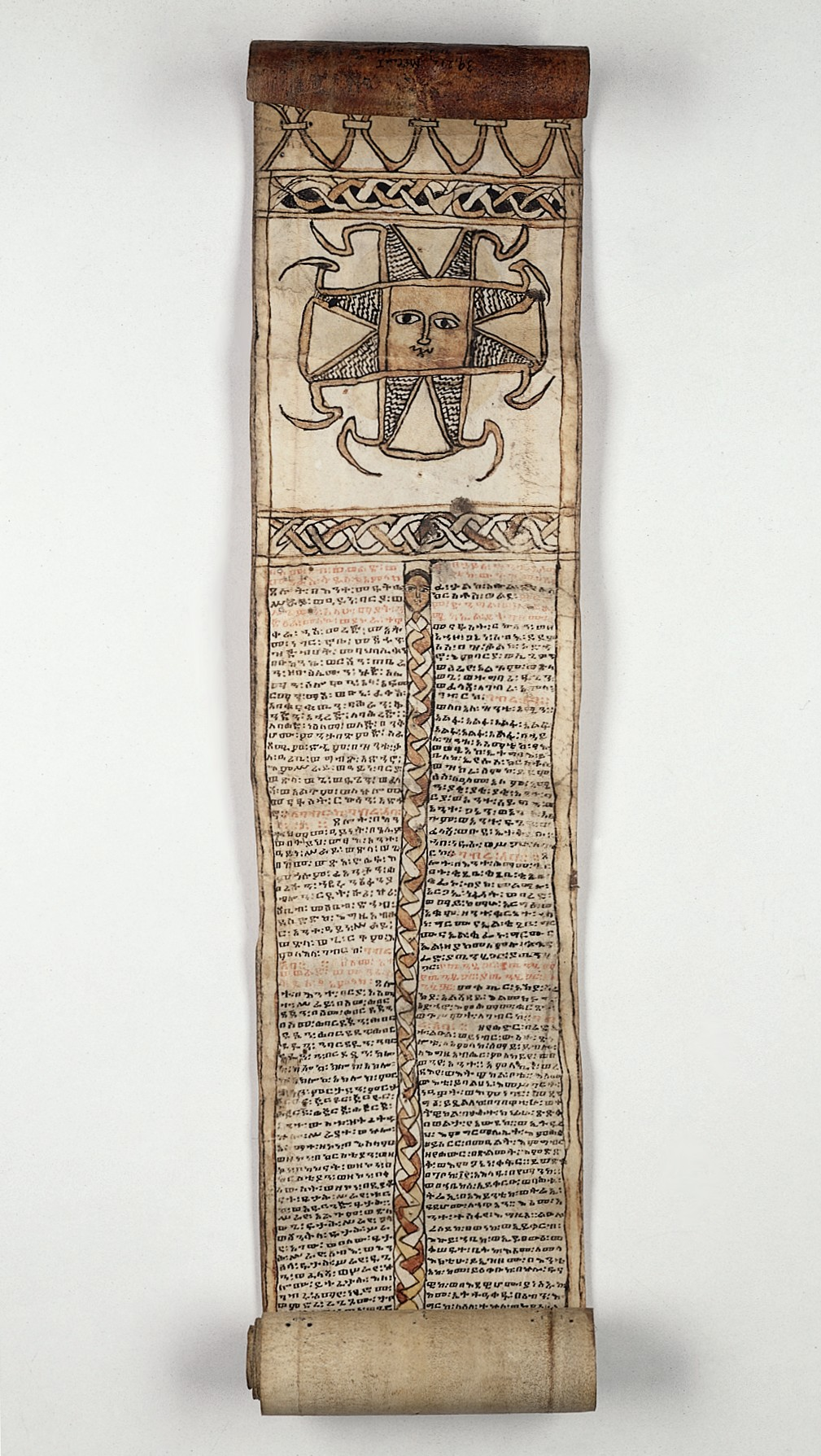
Magico-medical scroll, Wellcome Collection, Or MS IX.

The Wellcome Collection was catalogued by Stefan Strelcyn and his Catalogue of Ethiopian manuscripts of the Wellcome Institute of the History of Medicine in London, published in 1972, is available online through the Wellcome Library. The Wellcome originally had a collection of 34 manuscripts, acquired between 1913 and 1930. They retained 16 magico-medical scrolls and 1 divinatory manuscript; the remainder were transferred to the library of the British Museum in 1970 and 1971 and are now in the British Library. According to Strelcyn, the Wellcome material "constitutes and good and very representative collection of this kind of Ethiopian literature." The scrolls are dated to the eighteenth, nineteenth and early twentieth centuries based on Strelcyn's assessment of the palaeography.

== American collections of Ethiopian manuscripts ==
American collectors and libraries are relative latecomers to the field, collecting in earnest only from the 1940s. Since that time, the number of acquisitions has far outpaced collecting elsewhere. The largest collections in North America are at Catholic University of America, the Library of Congress, UCLA, Princeton University, and Howard University.

=== Library of Congress ===
The Kane collection at the Library of Congress includes 211 codices and 83 scrolls. The collection also has 1,095 pamphlets.

=== Princeton University, Princeton, New Jersey ===
The core collection of Ethiopic manuscripts at Princeton University was formed by Robert Garrett who collected 13 items in Ge’ez and Amharic and donated them to Princeton University Library in 1942. The collection is fully catalogued online. The Princeton Library has now posted 153 of its Ethiopic manuscripts online. The finding aid is available as a pdf; currently, none of the manuscripts have MARC records. Garrett acquired most his Ethiopic manuscripts from Enno Littmann who led expeditions to Tigray Region and Axum in 1905 and 1906. The Princeton collection has continued to grow through gift and purchase, and is especially strong in magico-medical scrolls of which there are now more than 500 specimens.

Princeton has an unusually large collection of Miracles of Mary manuscripts. This inspired the Princeton Ethiopian, Eritrean, and Egyptian Miracles of Mary project, which documents African medieval stories, paintings, and manuscripts about the Virgin Mary from the 1300s into the 1900s. Also included in the collection are Psalters, Prayer books, Homilies of Michael, Synaxaria, Anaphora of Addai and Mari, Missals and Gospels. Divination texts are also part of the collection. Of historiographical interest is the pseudepigraphical Book of Enoch (Ge'ez: መጽሐፈ ሄኖክ mätṣḥäfä henok). The Princeton manuscript, according to a stamp on the old binding, belong to Rev. H. C. Reichardt who was in charge of the Damacus mission of the London Society for Promoting Christianity amongst the Jews from 1875 until his resignation in 1881. The manuscript was one of several used by Robert Henry Charles (1855-1931) in his study of the Book of Enoch, and has since been commented on by Erho and Stuckenbruck. A report on the collection was written by Princeton librarian Don Skemer.

=== UCLA, Los Angeles ===
The Charles E. Young Research Library at the University of California, Los Angeles had a core collection 64 Ethiopian manuscripts in Ge'ez, Agaw and Amharic. Many were purchased by Wolf Leslau on the library's behalf during his research expeditions to Ethiopia in the 1960s. Subsequently, the library has acquired the extensive collection of Gerald and Barbara Weiner; this consists of 139 manuscripts and 110 scrolls. The Library has made over 50 of their manuscripts visible online in digital format.

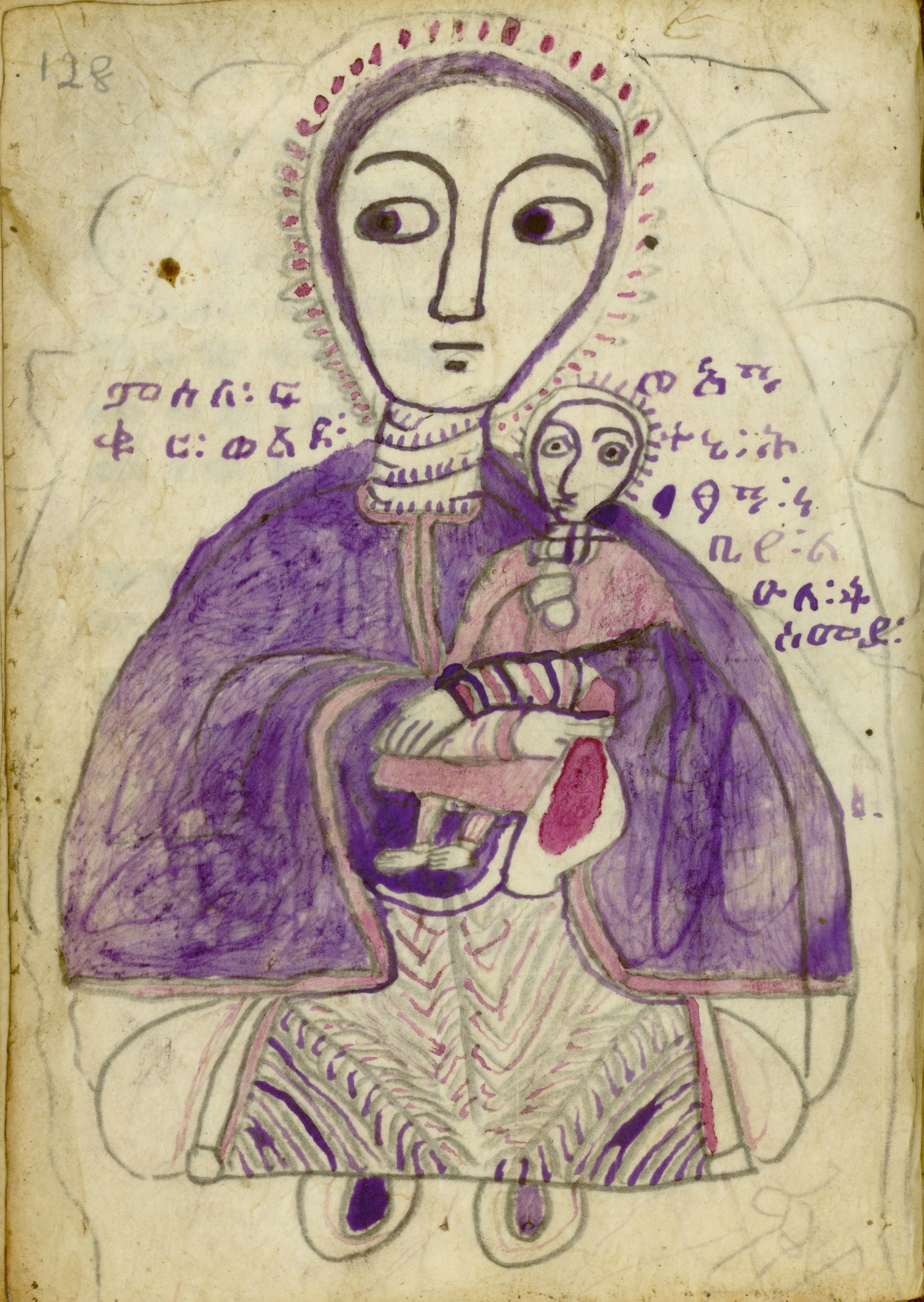
UCLA, Charles E. Young Research Library, Weddasé Maryam, late 19th century, Ms. 3.

=== Catholic University, Washington, D.C. ===
The collection at the Institute for the Study of Eastern Christianity, Catholic University of America, contains 375 codices, of which 177 are Islamic, plus three codex quires and 374 scrolls.

=== Hill Museum & Manuscript Library, Collegeville, Minn. ===
The Hill Museum & Manuscript Library (HMML) is a nonprofit organization, based in Collegeville, Minnesota, that photographs, catalogs, and provides free access to collections of manuscripts located in libraries around the world. The library holds a substantial number of photographic copies of Ethiopian manuscripts. HMML is the home for the Ethiopian Manuscript Microfilm Library (EMML), a collection that preserves microfilms of 8,000 Ethiopian manuscripts—the largest in the world—photographed throughout Ethiopia during the 1970 and 1980s. EMML is also the largest and most important repository for scholarly access to texts in Geʻez, and it records the ecclesiastical owners of individual manuscripts.

=== Howard University School of Divinity, Washington D.C., André Tweed Collection ===
André Tweed (1914 – 1993) was an alumnus of Howard University’s Medical School who became interested in Ethiopian manuscripts and bought many codices, healing scrolls, crosses and other artifacts. Tweed arranged for his collection to come to Howard University shortly before his passing. The Tweed manuscripts are catalogued online. The collection consists of 151 codices and 78 healing scrolls. From the 16th century are fragments of a psalter including illuminations of the Madonna and child, St. George, the trinity, and the annunciation. Books from the 18th century are as follows: a life of St. Cyrus with 53 illuminated portraits, a life of St. Graba, a liturgical text with two illuminated portraits, a treatise on the Trinity, eight Psalters, some with illuminated pages, a Malka Sellasse Trinity, two Mashafa Genzats (burial liturgies), an 18th- or 19th-century Deggwa (hymnbook) and a second fragment of a Deggwa, a Prayer of Peter along with other religion-magical prayers, another fragment of prayers from a religio-magical text, and a Dersana Michael – four readings for the festival of the Archangel including two 20th-century paintings. Included among the 19th- and 20th-century codices are a Prayer of St. Simon Stylite, a Book of the Miracles of Mary including several illuminations, an Ecumenical book of Mary with two portraits, several Miracles of Mary and similar texts, a Homily Hymnbook of St. Michael with a drawing of St. Michael and one of Haile Selassie, many Deggwas (hymnbooks), Psalters, various prayer books, various liturgical books, numerous Gospels of Johns, other Gospel books, New Testament collections without the Gospels, and many religio-magical books.

In addition to the manuscripts, there are a variety of religious artifacts: silver pectoral crosses, processional crosses made of various materials (silver, brass, copper, iron, wood) – some on wooden shafts, silver hand crosses, silver star of David pendants, other necklaces – some made of silver or wooden beads, bracelets, rings, a pocket watch, seals, hair ornaments, coins, artwork of various sorts including a late 15th- or early 16th-century painted diptych and many other diptychs and triptychs of religious subjects, musical instruments including a lyre, a bronze and wood sistrum (a kind of rattle), a one-string violin, a kalimba or hand piano, eating and drinking vessels such as bowls, vases, water jugs, baskets, a horse-hair wooden wisk, masks, headrests, stools, and a leather bridle.

One of the oldest and most important manuscripts collected by Tweed was a 15th-century copy of the Acts of St. Paul and St. Sarabamon, otherwise known as Tweed MS150. After the manuscript was discovered to have been in the Debre Libanos monastery in the 1970s, the manuscript was transferred there in 2016.

=== J. Paul Getty Museum, Los Angeles ===
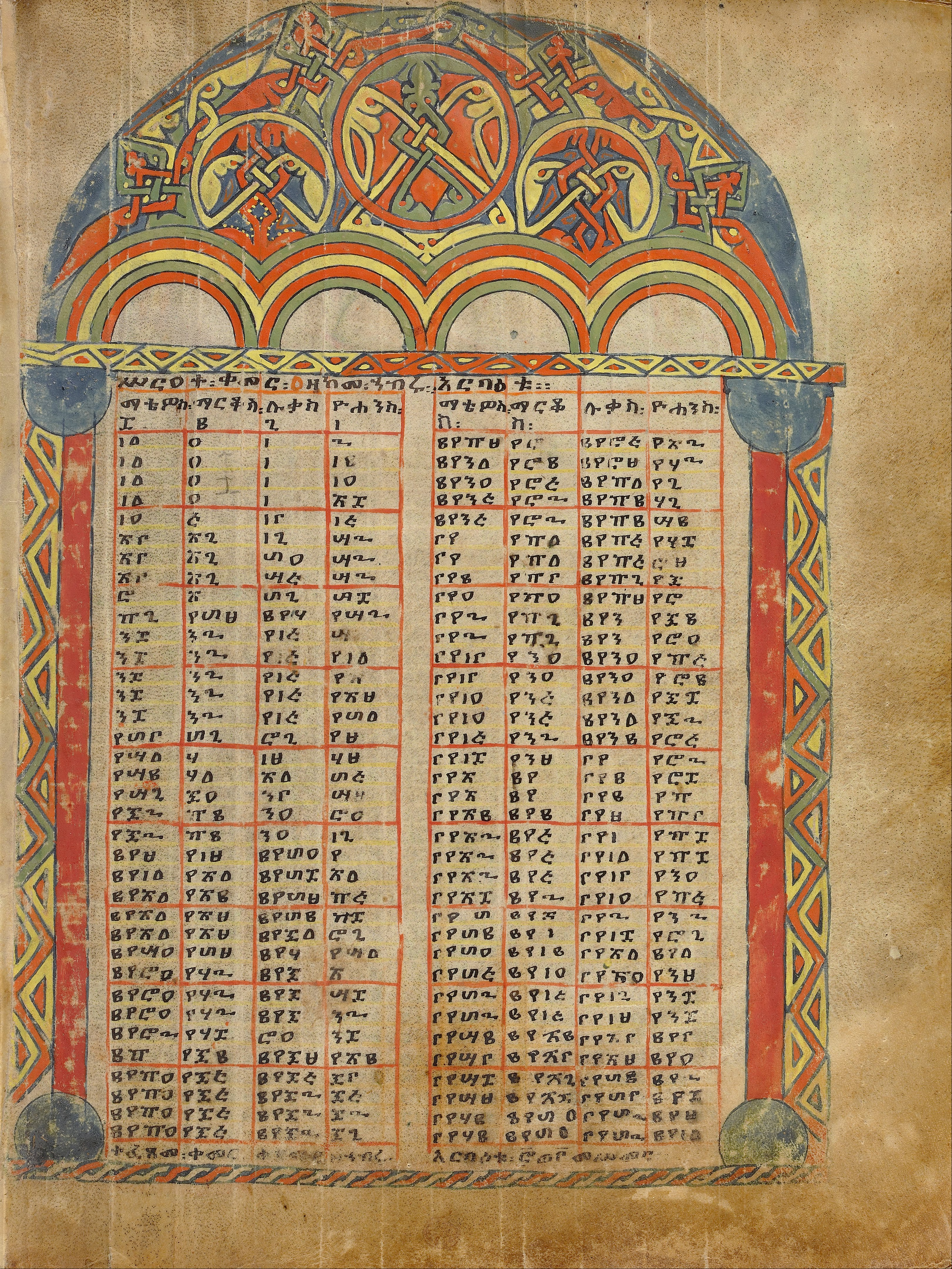
Gospels, Canon Table Page, J. Paul Getty Museum, MS102.

The J. Paul Getty Museum acquired a single manuscript of the Gospels dating to the early sixteenth century in 2008. A number of the folios are visible online through the museum's website as well as Wikicommons. It has now acquired some others.

=== University of Oregon, Museum of Natural and Cultural History ===
The Museum of Natural and Cultural History at the University of Oregon has a small number of manuscripts in its collection pertaining to Ethiopian history and material culture. Most of the objects were gifted by Jayne Bowerman Hall as a tribute to her husband William O. Hall, U.S. Ambassador to Ethiopia from 1967 to 1971. A catalogue of the collection was published in 2000.

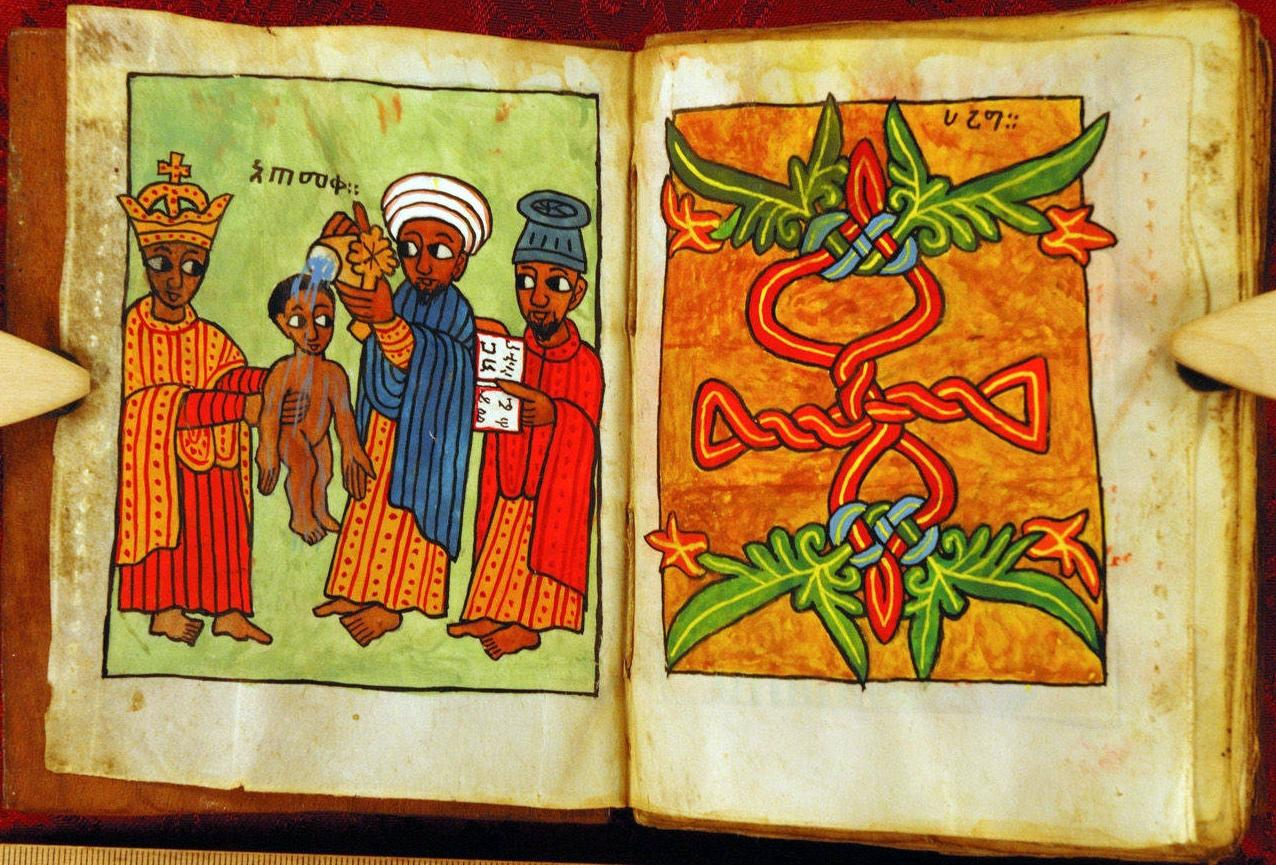
Biblical Manuscript in the MNCH University of Oregon, showing the Baptism, Shelf Mark 10-844 b.

=== Walters Art Museum, Baltimore ===
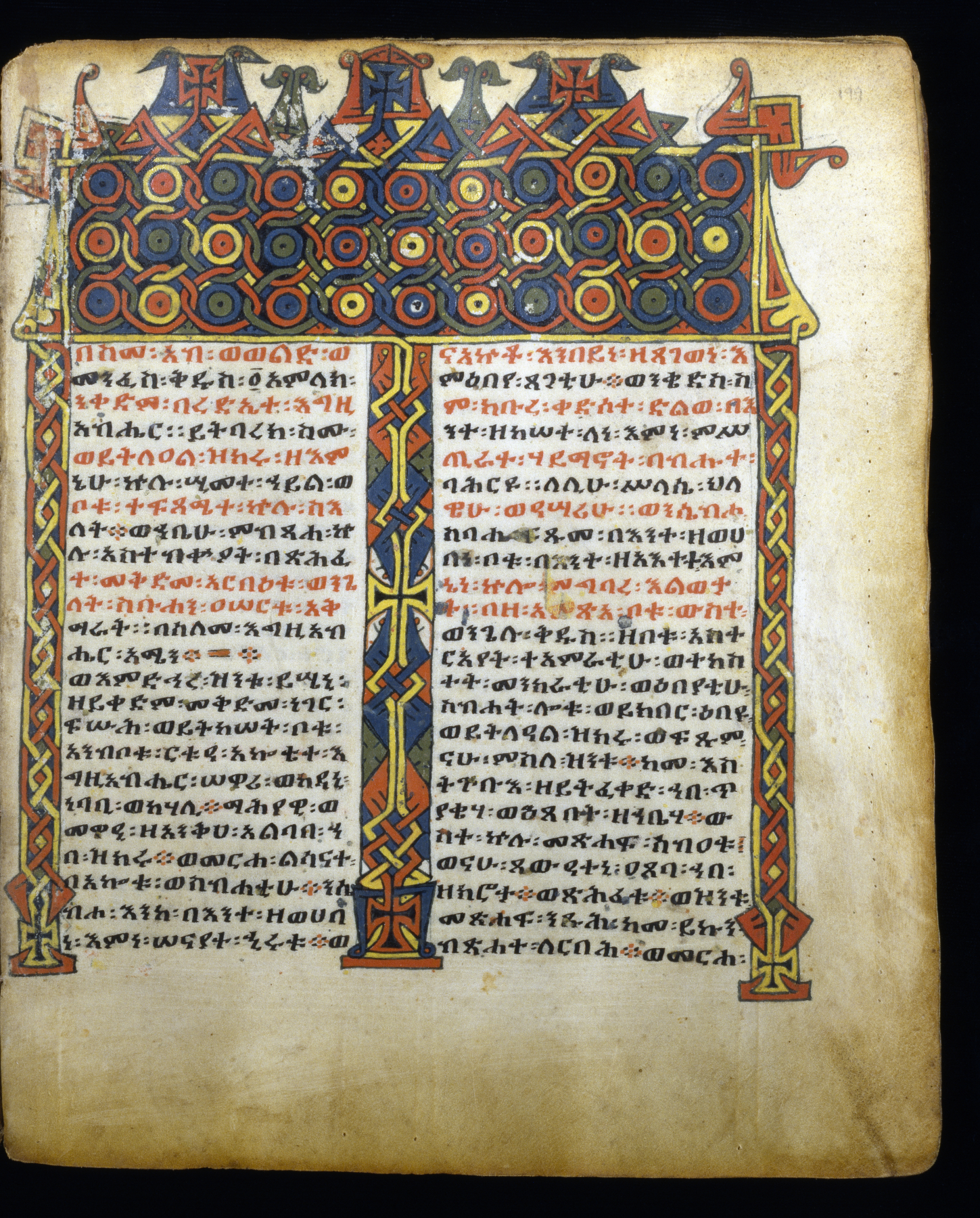
Leaf from Gunda Gunde Gospels, Walters Art Museum, W850199R

The Walters Art Museum in Baltimore, Maryland has a small collection of manuscripts and Ethiopian art. Digital catalogues of some of this material is available, notably Walters Ms. W.768, Ethiopic Psalter with Canticles, Song of Songs, and two hymns in praise of Mary. Ethiopian Gospels WDL13018 is available entire through Wikicommons.

== See also ==
- Ethiopian art
- Ethiopian chant
- Ethiopian historiography
- Ethio-SPaRe (2009–2015 research project)
