= Yaqob Beyene =

Ethiopian translator, scholar and academic (1936–2025)

- Born: 8 January 1936; Mai-Berazio, Tigray Province, Ethiopian Empire
- Died: 8 May 2025 (aged 89); Roccadaspide, Campania, Italy
- Occupations: Translator; scholar; academic
- Spouse: Paola Raeli
- Children: 2

Academic background
- Education: University of Naples "L'Orientale"

Academic work
- Discipline: Ethiopian studies
- Sub-discipline: Tigrinya language; Amharic language; Ge'ez language; Literature of Ethiopia; History of Ethiopia
- Institutions: University of Naples "L'Orientale"

Yaqob Beyene (8 January 1936 – 8 May 2025) was an Ethiopian translator, scholar and academic who lived and worked in Italy.

== Career ==
Born in Mai-Berazio, west of Adigrat, in the Tigray Province, in 1936 to a Catholic family of Tigrinya and Saho ethnicity, he briefly attempted an ecclesiastical career at the Ethiopian College of St. Stephen of the Abyssinians, Vatican City, where he specialized in philosophy and psychology.

In 1963, Lanfranco Ricci sent him to the University of Naples "L'Orientale", where he studied the Tigrinya language. He translated the four-volume Maṣḥafa Mesṭir (The Book of Mystery), originally written by Giyorgis of Segla.

Yaqob went on to become professor of Tigrinya, Amharic and Ge'ez at L'Orientale. A founding member of ISMEO (International Association for Mediterranean and Oriental Studies), his main interests were Tigrinya language and literature, history, and theology.

== Personal life and death ==
Yaqob was married to Italian teacher Paola Raeli of Capaccio Paestum, with whom he first settled in Roccadaspide and later in Capaccio Scalo; they had two sons together. He died at the Roccadaspide hospital in May 2025, at the age of 89.

== Selected works ==
=== Books ===
- L'unzione di Cristo nella teologia etiopica: contributo di ricerca su nuovi documenti etiopici inediti (1981)

=== Translations ===
- Storia d'Etiopia (1987)
- Il libro del mistero (Mashafa mestir), vol. 1 (1990)
- Il libro del mistero (Mashafa mestir), vol. 2 (1993)
