= Marius Chaîne =

French scholar

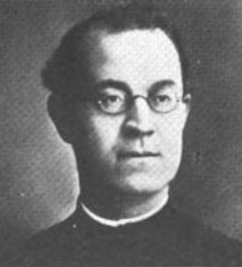
- Born: 10 August 1873; Tarascon, France
- Died: 19 January 1960 (aged 86)
- Occupation: Scholar

Abbé Marius Chaîne (10 August 1873 – 19 January 1960) was a French scholar of Ethiopic and Coptic philology.

== Life ==
Marius Chaîne was born in 1873 in Tarascon, Bouches-du-Rhône. He studied at the École des Hautes Études at the Sorbonne, where he was a student of Joseph Halévy, and at the École du Louvre in Paris, where he was a student of Eugène Revillout. In 1897 he was ordained and joined the Society of Jesus, but abandoned it after World War I.

Chaîne was a professor of Oriental languages at Saint Joseph University, Beirut; the Pontifical Gregorian University, Rome; and the Pontifical Biblical Institute. He penned the article "Ethiopia" for the Catholic Encyclopedia.

He devoted his life to Ethiopic and Coptic philology.

He died at Sainte-Marie du Désert Abbey, in Bellegarde-Sainte-Marie, Haute-Garonne.

== Works ==
- 1907: Grammaire éthiopienne. Beyrouth: Imprimerie Catholique. Nouvelle édition 1938. (online version at the Internet Archive).
- 1909: Apocrypha de B. Maria Virgine. Lipsiae: Harrassowitz.
- 1912: Catalogue des manuscrits éthiopiens de la collection d’Abbadie. Paris: Leroux.
- 1913: Chaîne, Marius (1913). Catalogue des manuscrits éthiopiens de la collection Mondon-Vidailhet. Paris: Leroux.
- 1925: La chronologie des temps chrétiens de l'Égypte et de l'Éthiopie. Paris: Geuthner.
- 1933: Éléments de grammaire dialectale copte: bohairique, sahidique, achmimique, fayoumique. Paris: Paul Geuthner.
- 1934: Les dialectes coptes assioutiques A2.
- 1938: Notions de langue égyptienne (Vol. I). Paris.
- 1942: Notions de langue égyptienne (Vol. II). Paris.
- 1955: La proposition nominale dans les dialectes coptes. Paris: A.-Maisonneuve.
