= Ethiopian studies =

Academic cluster dedicated to research on matters relating to Ethiopia and Eritrea

Ethiopian studies, and less commonly Ethiopian and Eritrean studies refers to a multidisciplinary academic cluster dedicated to research on Ethiopia and Eritrea. The field is closely tied to Orientalism, having a significant overlap with Egyptology, but particularly Semitic studies (including Aramaic, Arabic, Hebraic, and Assyriology). It has continuity with the linguistic and socio-historiological work of 17th century Ethiopian monk Abba Gorgoryos and German orientalist Hiob Ludolf.

== Overview ==
The classical concept of Ethiopian and Eritrean studies, developed by European scholars, is based on disciplines like philology and linguistics, history and ethnography. It includes the study of Ethiopian and Eritrean arts and the history and theology of the Ethiopian Orthodox Church. The classical core of Ethiopian and Eritrean studies is the philology of the written sources of Christian Ethiopia and Eritrea and Ethio-semitic linguistics. While this approach is still alive and has its role, Ethiopian and Eritrean studies has opened to a wider concept that tries to avoid a bias in favour of the Christian Abyssinian culture (Amhara, Tigrinya; cf. Habesha people). It includes the study of the other Afro-Asiatic languages and cultures of Ethiopia and Eritrea besides those of Ethio-semitic derivation; the nation's non-Afro-Asiatic languages and cultures, including the southern Ethiopian cultures; non-Christian faiths, comprising Islam in Ethiopia and Eritrea and traditional religions; social and political sciences; as well as contemporary issues like environment and development studies.

== Institute of Ethiopian Studies ==
The study of Ethiopian and Eritrean topics had been long been concentrated in European academic institutions. This is seen in such examples as Enno Littmann directing the German Aksum-Expedition in Ethiopia in 1905. When Italy invaded Ethiopia, some Italian scholars such as Enrico Cerulli were active in Ethiopia. As a result, many Ethiopian manuscript collections and other materials from Ethiopia are found in European museums and libraries.

Ethiopian studies began a new era in 1963 when the Institute of Ethiopian Studies was founded on the campus of Haile Selassie University (which was later renamed Addis Ababa University). The heart of the IES is the library, containing a wide variety of published and unpublished materials on all types of matters related to Ethiopia and the Horn of Africa.

== Conferences ==
Ethiopian and Eritrean studies scholars congregate at the interdisciplinary International Conference of Ethiopian Studies, a series of gatherings that takes place every three years. Traditionally, every third conference is held in Ethiopia. The 19th meeting was in Warsaw, August 24–28, 2015. The 20th conference was in Mekelle, Ethiopia, in 2018. The 21st conference was held in Addis Ababa. Volumes of proceedings are published after most conferences.

== Journals and publications ==
Ethiopian and Eritrean studies is served by a few journals and publications specifically devoted to the field. These include:

- Journal of Ethiopian Studies (Ethiopia)
- ITYOPIS Northeast African Journal of Social Sciences and Humanities (Ethiopia)
- Annales d'Éthiopie (France)
- Aethiopica: International Journal of Ethiopian and Eritrean Studies (Germany)
- Rassegna di Studi Etiopici (Italy)
- Northeast African Studies (US)
- Encyclopaedia Aethiopica (Germany)
- Journal of Oromo Studies (US)
- International Journal of Ethiopian Studies (US)

== Notable Ethiopianists ==
- Amsalu Aklilu
- Bahru Zewde
- Getatchew Haile
- Merid Wolde Aregay
- Mesfin Woldemariam
- Ephraim Isaac
- Taddesse Tamrat
- Sergew Hable Selassie
- Antoine d'Abbadie
- Lionel Bender
- Enrico Cerulli
- Marcel Cohen
- Carlo Conti Rossini
- August Dillmann
- Harold C. Fleming
- Angelo Del Boca
- Richard Hayward
- Robert Hetzron
- Olga Kapeliuk
- Wolf Leslau
- Donald N. Levine
- Enno Littmann
- Hiob Ludolf
- Thomas Lambdin
- Richard Pankhurst
- Alula Pankhurst
- Edward Ullendorff
- Lanfranco Ricci
- David Appleyard
- Haggai Erlich
- Alessandro Bausi
- Steve Kaplan
- Yaqob Beyene

== See also ==
- Somali studies
- Ethio-SPaRe
