= Siegbert Uhlig =

German academic

- Born: February 16, 1939 (age 87); Königsberg, Germany
- Occupation: Academic
- Awards: Edward Ullendorff Medal, The British Academy (2016)

Academic background
- Education: Theological Studies; Ph.D., Protestant Theology; Ph.D., Oriental Studies; Habilitation, Ethiopian Studies
- Alma mater: Friedensau Theological Seminary; University of Rostock; University of Hamburg
- Thesis: 1. August Wilhelm Dieckhoffs Stellungnahme zu kirchenpolitischen und theologischen Streitfragen seiner Zeit unter dem Aspekt seiner reformationsgeschichtlichen Forschungen; 2. Hiob Ludolfs Theologia Aethiopica; 3. Äthiopische Paläographie (Habilitation)

Academic work
- Institutions: University of Hamburg

Siegbert Uhlig is a German academic. He is emeritus professor at the University of Hamburg.

Uhlig is most known for his contributions to the field of Ethiopian Studies, primarily through his work on the Encyclopaedia Aethiopica. He developed the project, took over the scientific management of the encyclopedia, and published it. His research encompasses Ethiopian paleography, the publication of Ethiopian text editions of biblical books, and the edition of the Ethiopian Enoch in German language. He founded the journal Aethiopica, serving as a platform for scholarly discussions in the field. Furthermore, he founded the German-Ethiopian Foundation, supporting Ethiopian studies research and young academics in the field. Uhlig has been married to Waltraud (née Lippert) since 1962 and has two sons: Dr. Hilmar Uhlig (1963) and Dr. Sven Uhlig (1966).

== Education ==
Uhlig pursued Theological Studies at the Friedensau Theological Seminary from 1957 to 1961. In 1969, he earned his Ph.D. in Protestant Theology from the University of Rostock, presenting a thesis on A.W. Dieckhoff's statement on church political and theological disputes of his time. In 1980, he obtained his second doctorate in Oriental Studies from the University of Hamburg. In 1985, he completed his habilitation in Ethiopian Studies at the University of Hamburg with research on Ethiopian paleography.

== Career ==
From 1961 to 1976, Uhlig was pastor of a Protestant Free Church (Adventist Church). Between 1980 and 1985, he worked on a research project of the Deutsche Forschungsgemeinschaft, focusing on Ethiopian paleography. From 1985 to 1990, Uhlig served as a fellow at the Research Center for Historische Palästinakunde at the University of Osnabrück. During this period, he was also appointed as an associate professor (Außerplanmäßiger Professor) at the same university. In 1990, the University of Hamburg appointed him as a full professor of African Studies with a focus on Ethiopian Studies. He held this position until his retirement in 2004. In 1998, Uhlig founded the journal Aethiopica: International Journal of Ethiopian and Eritrean Studies, and in 2002, he established the Research Center for Ethiopian Studies at the University of Hamburg, now known as the Hiob Ludolf Centre for Ethiopian and Eritrean Studies. From 1994 to 2009, he served as the editor of the monograph series Aethiopistische Forschungen. Furthermore, between 1994 and 2010 [2014), he developed the project and acted as the scientific director and general editor of the international project Encyclopaedia Aethiopica.

In 1999, Uhlig established the German-Ethiopian Foundation to promote research in Ethiopian studies and support emerging scholars. Financed by private funds and the German-Ethiopian Foundation, Uhlig established the Hiob Ludolf Visiting Professorship in 2003/04, which deals with topics from politics, business and society.

== Selected works ==
Uhlig's main work is the Encyclopaedia Aethiopica, which he worked on for around 20 years and edited four out of five volumes. It scientific encyclopaedia provides with 4365 articles on Ethiopia and the neighbouring regions; it covers topics from history, languages, literature, ethnology, religion, culture, society and art.

Uhlig's 1988 work Äthiopische Paläographie provides basic research for the chronological classification of Ethiopian manuscripts; a condensed version of which was used in the Introduction to Ethiopian Palaeography (1990).

Uhlig also edited an illustrated volume David Appleyard and others in 2017, titled Ethiopia: History, Culture, and Challenges. The book delves into various facets of Ethiopia, encompassing geography, history, cultures, religions, society, politics, contemporary developments, and major challenges. A German edition of the book, titled Äthiopien – Geschichte, Kultur, Herausforderungen (2018), has also been published.

In collaboration with Gernot Bühring, Uhlig has jointly published and provided commentary on a rare early work concerning Ethiopian history in 1994, Damian de Góis' work on the faith and customs of the Ethiopians dating back to the year 1540.

After the death of the bibliographer Lockot, Uhlig collaborated with Verena Böll to edit and publish his bibliography titled Bibliographia Aethiopica II (1998).

== Research ==
Uhlig has primarily contributed foundational works to the field of Ethiopian Studies. At the beginning of his career, palaeographic and codicological investigations were at the forefront of his research interests, later shifting to a focus on textual-critical contributions. Throughout each phase of his research, he focused on the transitional period from pre-scientific Ethiopian studies to the establishment of scientific Ethiopian Studies, such as the works of Damian de Góis and Ludolf.

The focus of Uhlig's work lies in providing essential working materials in the field of Ethiopian studies, such as the Encyclopaedia Aethiopica.

== Awards and honors ==
- 2016 – Edward Ullendorff Medal, The British Academy
- 2018 – Award for Professional Excellence, Bikila Awards

== Bibliography ==
=== Books ===
- Das äthiopische Henochbuch. Jüdische Schriften aus hellenistisch-römischer Zeit V 6 (1984) ISBN 978-3-579-03956-5
- Äthiopische Paläographie (1988) ISBN 978-3-515-04562-9
- Novum Testamentum Aethiopice: Die Gefangenschaftsbriefe (1993) ISBN 3-515-05447-2
- Damian de Góis’ Schrift über Glaube und Sitten der Äthiopier (1994) ISBN 978-3-447-03512-5
- Encyclopaedia Aethiopica (2003–2014) ISBN 978-3-447-04746-3

==== Festschrift for Uhlig ====
- Studia Aethiopica (2004) ISBN 9783447048910

=== Selected articles ===
- Uhlig, S. (1988). Ludolfs Deutung der äthiopischen Geschichte des 17. Jahrhunderts in der ‚Schaubühne der Weltgeschichte‘. Afrika und Übersee 71(2), 267–286.
- Uhlig, S. (1989). Ein pseudepigraphischer Actaschluss in der äthiopischen Version, Oriens Christianus 73,129-136.
- Uhlig, S. (1999). Dǝrsan des Yaʿqob von Sǝrug für den vierten Sonntag im Monat Taḫśaś. Aethiopica, 2, 7-52.
- Uhlig, S. (2001). Eine trilinguale ʿEzana-Inschrift. Aethiopica, 4, 7-31.
- Uhlig, S. (2003). Bible: Biblical text criticism, Encyclopaedia Aethiopica I, 565–569
- Uhlig, S.(2007). Ludolf, Hiob, Encyclopaedia Aethiopica III, 601–603.
