= Stefan Strelcyn =

Stefan Strelcyn (28 June 1918 – 19 May 1981) was a Polish scholar of Ethiopian Studies and a Semitist.

== Life ==
Stefan Strelcyn was born in Warsaw in 1918, the son of Szaja Strelcyn and his wife Cywia. In Warsaw he attended the Gimnazjum Ascola and the Technical Engineering School. In 1938 he left Poland and went to Belgium, where he devoted himself to oriental archaeology and philology at the Université libre de Bruxelles. In 1945, following service in the Polish forces and with the French Resistance (for which, after returning from deportation to Germany, he received the Croix de Guerre), he studied classical Ethiopic and Amharic at the Sorbonne, the École nationale des langues orientales vivantes and the École pratique des hautes études. He was a student of Marcel Cohen.

In 1950 Strelcyn was expelled from France and returned to Poland, where he became an Associate Professor of Semitic Studies at the University of Warsaw and, four years later, a full professor and head of the Department of Semitic Studies. Eight years later, in 1962, he helped to establish the University's Centre for African Studies, making Poland "an internationally recognized nucleus of oriental and African research." In 1967 he was awarded the Haile Selassie Prize for Ethiopian studies.

In 1969, following an anti-Semitic purge of universities and other cultural institutions then taking place in Poland, Strelcyn was forced to move once more – this time to Britain, where he became a Visiting Scholar at the School of African and Oriental Studies (SOAS) in London and then, in 1970, a Lecturer (and subsequently Reader) in Semitic Languages at the University of Manchester. Edward Ullendorff noted that, once settled in England, Strelcyn engaged in a "prodigious literary activity, so that the output of this period... equals that of all the preceding years of his career." He complained of heart trouble after returning from a visit to the Accademia dei Lincei in Rome in April 1981, and died of a massive heart attack in Manchester the following month.

== Works ==
- 1950: Sur une priere 'Falacha' publiée par C. Conti Rossini : dans les ’Appunti di storia e letteratura Falascia’. Roma: Piox.
- 1951: Un magicien grec en Éthiopie. Paris: Imprimerie nationale.
- 1954: Catalogue des manuscrits éthiopiens (Collection Griaule). Paris: Bibliothèque nationale.
- 1955: Prières magiques éthiopiennes pour délier les charmes (maftəḥe šərāy). Warsaw: P.W.N.
- 1956: La literature religieuse Falacha (état de la question). Bologna : N. Zanichelli.
- 1973: Médecine et plantes d'Éthiopie. Napoli : Istituto Universitario orientale.
- 1981: "Les mystères des Psaumes, traité éthiopien sur l'emploi des Psaumes (amharique ancien)", in: Bulletin of the School of Oriental and African Studies 44/1, pp. 54–84.
