= Encyclopaedia Aethiopica =

Encyclopedia of Ethiopian studies

The Encyclopaedia Aethiopica (EAe) is a basic English-language encyclopaedia for Ethiopian and Eritrean studies. The Encyclopaedia Aethiopica provides information in all fields of the discipline, i.e. anthropology, archaeology, ethnology, history, geography, languages and literatures, art, religion, culture and basic data. Although the main audience is academic, most articles are readable also for non-specialists. The EAe is illustrated with maps and photographs. It employs an in-house form of romanization of Geʽez, Amharic, and other languages, which varies greatly from standard formats, such as BGN/PCGN: the emperor Menelik II's name, for example, is written as "Mənilək II". Nevertheless, the EAe romanization scheme is used extensively throughout modern Ethiopic scholarship.

== Authorship and structure ==
The Encyclopaedia Aethiopica has hundreds of authors from at least thirty countries. High academic standards are secured by an editorial team based at the Research Unit Ethiopian Studies (since 2009 Hiob Ludolf Centre for Ethiopian Studies) at the University of Hamburg in Germany, and experts on all important fields and a board of international supervisors supported the editors. Siegbert Uhlig, former holder of the chair of Ethiopian Studies at the Asia-Africa Institute of the University of Hamburg, was editor-in-chief; in 2009 Alessandro Bausi succeeded him, taking on the fifth and final volume. At a presentation of the Encyclopaedia in Rome, Bausi described some of the process of producing this set of volumes.

The series consists of five volumes (published in 2003, 2005, 2007, 2010, 2014). The first volume includes letters A–C, the second volume is dedicated to letters D–Ha, the third volume covers He–N, the fourth volume has the terms starting with the letters O–X, and the final volume has the terms for letters Y–Z, including a comprehensive index, supplementary articles, and additional maps and material.

The EAe is funded by the Deutsche Forschungsgemeinschaft, the Zeit-Stiftung Ebelin und Gerd Bucerius, the Fritz Thyssen Foundation, the German Israeli Foundation, the Johanna und Fritz Buch Gedächtnis-Stiftung, the Karl H. Ditze Stiftung, the Sigrid Rausing Trust and the University of Hamburg.

== Critical reception ==
In 2010, following the 2007 publication of volume 3 of EAe, Paolo Marrassini described the EAe as being "confidently classified as the most important systematic work in the field of Ethiopian studies ever undertaken."
