= Amsalu Aklilu =

Amsalu Aklilu (2 September 1929–19 December 2013) was a distinguished lexicographer of Amharic and a language professor at Addis Ababa University, a major figure in Ethiopian studies. He was born in Dessie, Wällo, attended a local church school, and later attended and graduated from Holy Trinity Secondary School, in Addis Ababa. He obtained his bachelor's degree from Cairo University and his doctorate from the University of Tübingen in German.

He produced a number of scholarly books, articles, and reviews (written in Amharic, German, and English), but he will always be remembered for the English-Amharic Dictionary, which he produced with G. P. Mosback in 1981 and was positively reviewed, followed by his 1986 Amharic-English, also reviewed positively. He also produced an Amharic-Arabic dictionary but did not live to finish the publication of his Amharic-German dictionary.

In addition to teaching in the Institute of Language Studies at Addis Ababa University, he served in a number of administrative roles, including Dean of the Institute of Language Studies, department chair for the Department of Ethiopian Languages and Literature, and a member of the editorial board of the Journal of Ethiopian Studies.

"In 1997, Amsalu moved to Hamburg, Germany, where he became a lecturer of Amharic and Ge'ez for the department of African and Ethiopian Studies. There his duties included teaching Amharic and Ge'ez to an influx of foreign students and introducing his country's history and culture... He served there until 2002."
