= Wolf Leslau =

Polish-American linguist (1906–2006)

- וולף לסלאו
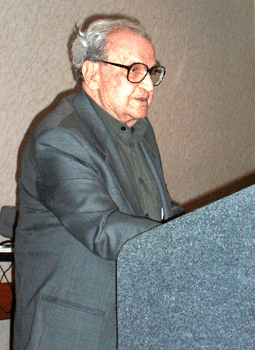
- Leslau in 2004 at the 32nd North American Conference on Afroasiatic Linguistics
- Born: 14 November 1906; Kshepitse, Russian Empire (now Krzepice, Poland)
- Died: 18 November 2006 (aged 100); Fullerton, California
- Citizenship: Poland; Stateless; United States
- Spouse: Charlotte Leslau (before 1931)
- Children: 2
- Awards: Haile Selassie Prize (1965), Medal of the Order of the Blue Nile-First Class (1983), Lidzbarski Gold Medal Award (1996)

Academic background
- Education: University of Paris

Academic work
- Discipline: Semitic linguistics
- Sub-discipline: Gafat language; Ethio-Semitic languages
- Institutions: Asia Institute; New School for Social Research; Brandeis University; University of California, Los Angeles

Wolf Leslau (Yiddish: וולף לסלאו; born November 14, 1906, in Krzepice, Vistula Land, Poland; died November 18, 2006, in Fullerton, California) was a scholar of Semitic languages and one of the foremost authorities on Semitic languages of Ethiopia.

== Youth and education ==
Leslau was born in Krzepice, a small town near Częstochowa, Poland. When he was a child his family was very poor, and after contracting tuberculosis he usually had to keep a thermometer with him to monitor his body temperature, although the reasons for this are unknown. He was orphaned by the age of 10, and was raised by his brother, and received a yeshiva education.

To avoid military service in the Polish army, he gave up his Polish citizenship (becoming a stateless person) and emigrated to Vienna, where he engaged in Semitic studies at the University of Vienna until 1931. He then went to the Sorbonne to study under Marcel Cohen. His studies included most of the Semitic languages, including Hebrew, Aramaic, Akkadian, Soqotri and Ethiopic.

== War years ==
Leslau was arrested by the French police and sent to an internment camp in the Pyrenees where he spent the harsh winter of 1939–1940 with his wife and child. He was later moved to Camp des Milles, a concentration camp near Aix-en-Provence. However, with the assistance of an international aid group, he escaped with his family before the Nazis took over the camp in 1942.

Escaping to the United States, he later became a naturalized citizen of the United States. He settled in New York City, and received a Guggenheim Fellowship to continue his studies of the Semitic languages in Ethiopia. He traveled throughout the country, recording endangered Ethiopian languages. For one language, Gafat, Leslau was able to locate only four speakers. It became extinct shortly thereafter.

== Career in the United States and fieldwork ==
After teaching at the Asia Institute, the New School for Social Research, and for 4 years at Brandeis University, he joined the faculty of University of California, Los Angeles in 1955. He was instrumental in establishing the Department of Near Eastern Studies and the Center for Near East Studies.

=== Ethiopia ===
Leslau specialized in previously unrecorded and unstudied Semitic languages of Ethiopia. His first trip to Ethiopia in 1946 was funded by a Guggenheim fellowship.

=== South Arabia and Yemen ===
In 1950, Leslau traveled to South Arabia and Yemen. There he made field recordings at gatherings of South Arabian Bedouins and Yemenite Jews. In 1951, the recordings were issued by Folkways Records as Music of South Arabia in their "ethnic" series, FE-4221. The recordings, as well as Leslau's liner notes, are available for download from Smithsonian Folkways.

== Recognitions and retirement ==
In 1965 Leslau received the Haile Selassie Prize for Ethiopian Studies in Addis Ababa from the Emperor of Ethiopia, Haile Selassie. He held the position of professor emeritus at UCLA until his death at the age of 100. He remained active in research and writing until his death. He learned to use a Macintosh computer at the age of 80.

Leslau died at a nursing home in Fullerton, California, in 2006.

== Partial bibliography ==
- 1938: Lexique Soqotri (sudarabique moderne) avec comparaisons et explications étymologiques. Paris: Klincksieck.
- 1941: Documents tigrigna: grammaire et textes. Paris: Libraire C. Klincksieck.
- 1945: Short Grammar of Tigré. Publications of the American Oriental Society, Offprint Series, No. 18. New Haven.
- 1945: Gafat Documents: Records of a South-Ethiopic language. American Oriental series, no. 28. New Haven.
- 1949. "Ethiopic proverbs of Chaha." Word 5, no. 2: 214–223.
- 1950: Ethiopic Documents: Gurage. New York: Viking Fund Publications in Anthropology, no. 14.
- 1951: Falasha Anthology. Yale Judaica Series, vol. 6. New Haven & London: Yale University Press. (ISBN 0-300-03927-1)
- 1956: Étude descriptive et comparative du Gafat (éthiopien méridional). Paris: Klincksieck, xx + 277 p.
- 1958: Ethiopic and South Arabic contributions to the Hebrew lexicon. Berkeley: Univ. of California Press, 76 p.
- 1958: The verb in Harari. Berkeley: Univ. of California Press, x + 86 p.
- 1965: An Amharic Conversation Book. Wiesbaden: Harrassowitz. (ISBN 3-447-00553-X)
- 1965: Ethiopians speak. Studies in cultural background. Part 1: Harari. Near Eastern Studies, no. 7. Berkeley: University of California Press.
- 1965: An annotated bibliography of the Semitic languages of Ethiopia. The Hague: Mouton.
- 1966: Ethiopians Speak: Studies in Cultural Background. Part 2: Chaha. University of California Publication. Near Eastern Studies, no. 9, 219 p.
- 1967: Amharic Textbook. Wiesbaden: Harrassowitz. (ISBN 3-447-00554-8)
- 1968: Ethiopians Speak: Studies in Cultural Background. Part 3: Soddo. University of California Publications. Near Eastern Studies, vol. 11.
- 1969: Hebrew Cognates in Amharic. Wiesbaden: Harrassowitz. (ISBN 3-447-00555-6)
- 1973: English-Amharic Context Dictionary. Wiesbaden: Harrassowitz, xviii + 1503 p. (ISBN 3-447-01482-2)
- 1976: Concise Amharic Dictionary. (Reissue edition: 1996) Berkeley and Los Angeles: University of California Press. (ISBN 0-520-20501-4)
- 1979: Etymological Dictionary of Gurage (Ethiopic). 3 vols. Wiesbaden: Otto Harrassowitz. (ISBN 3-447-02041-5)
- 1981: Ethiopians Speak: Studies in Cultural Background. Part 4: Muher. Äthiopistische Forschungen, no. 11. Wiesbaden: Franz Steiner Verlag. (ISBN 3-515-03657-1)
- 1982. "Harari riddles." Rassegna di Studi Etiopici 29 (1982): 39–85.
- 1982: Gurage Folklore: Proverbs, beliefs, and riddles. Studien zur Kulturkunde, no. 63. Wiesbaden: Franz Steiner Verlag. (ISBN 3-515-03513-3)
- 1983: Ethiopians Speak: Studies in Cultural Background. Part 5: Chaha and Ennemor. Äthiopistische Forschungen, no. 16. Wiesbaden: Franz Steiner Verlag.
- 1987: Comparative dictionary of Ge‛ez (Classical Ethiopic) : Gǝ‛ǝz-English/English-Gǝ‛ǝz with an index of the Semitic roots. Wiesbaden: Harrassowitz, xlix + 813 p.
- 1988: Fifty Years of Research: Selection of articles on Semitic, Ethiopian Semitic and Cushitic. Wiesbaden: Harrassowitz, xlv + 503 p. (ISBN 3-447-02829-7)
- 1989: Concise dictionary of Gǝ‛ǝz (Classical Ethiopic). Wiesbaden: Harrassowitz, 247 p.
- 1990: Arabic Loanwords in Ethiopian Semitic. Wiesbaden: Harrassowitz. (ISBN 3-447-03000-3)
- 1992: Gurage Studies : Collected Articles. Wiesbaden: Harrassowitz, xxix + 744 p. (ISBN 3-447-03189-1)
- 1995: Reference Grammar of Amharic. Harrassowitz, Wiesbaden. (ISBN 3-447-03372-X)
- 1997: Ethiopic Documents: Argobba. Grammar and dictionary. Wiesbaden: Harrassowitz. (ISBN 3-447-03955-8)
- 1999: Zway Ethiopic Documents. Äthiopistische Forschungen, no. 51. Wiesbaden: Harrassowitz. (ISBN 3-447-04162-5)
- 2000: Introductory Grammar of Amharic. Wiesbaden: Harrassowitz, xix + 232 p. (ISBN 3-447-04271-0)
- 2001: (with Thomas L. Kane) Amharic Cultural Reader. Wiesbaden: Harrassowitz. (ISBN 3-447-04496-9)
- 2004: The Verb in Mäsqan as Compared with other Gurage Dialects. Wiesbaden: Harrassowitz. (ISBN 3-447-04905-7)

== Festschriften ==
- Segert, Stanislav & András J. E. Bodrogligeti (eds.), Ethiopian Studies: Dedicated to Wolf Leslau on the Occasion of his seventy-fifth birthday, November 14, 1981, by friends and colleagues. Wiesbaden: Harrassowitz 1983, xii + 582 p. (ISBN 3-447-02314-7).
- Kaye, Alan S. (ed.), Semitic studies in honor of Wolf Leslau on the occasion of his 85th birthday, November 14, 1991. 2 Vols. Wiesbaden: Harrasowitz 1991, lxviii. + 1719 p. (ISBN 3-447-03168-9).
- Hudson, Grover (ed.), Essays on Gurage Language and Culture: Dedicated to Wolf Leslau on the Occasion of His 90th Birthday, November 14, 1996. Wiesbaden: Harrassowitz 1996, 239 p. (ISBN 3-447-03830-6).

== Relevant literature ==
- Devens, Monica S., "On the Occasion of Wolf Leslau's 100th Birthday", in: Aethiopica 9 (2006), pp. 220–221.
- Müller, Walter W., "Zum Gedenken an Wolf Leslau", in: Aethiopica 10 (2007), pp. 210–218.
- Fikre Tolossa. Wolf Leslau (1906–2006). 2007. International Journal of Ethiopian Studies 3.1: 121–123.
- Kaye, Alan S. "Wolf Leslau." Language 83, no. 4 (2007): 870–875.
