= Fetha Negest =

Ethiopian legal code compiled c. 1340

The Fetha Negest (Ge'ez: ፍትሐ ነገሥት, romanized: fətḥa nägäśt, lit. 'Justice of the Kings') is a theocratic legal code compiled around 1240 by the Coptic Egyptian Christian writer Abu'l-Fada'il ibn al-Assal in Arabic. It was later translated into Ge'ez in Ethiopia in the 15th century and expanded upon with numerous local laws. Ibn al-Assal took his laws partly from apostolic writings, and partly from former law codes of the Byzantine rulers.

== Textual history ==
The first part of Fetha Negest deals with mostly ecclesiastic affairs, outlining the structure of the Church hierarchy, sacraments, and such matters. It was compiled from the Bible, writings of early Church fathers including St. Basil and St. Hippolytus, and various canons adopted at the Council of Nicaea, the Council of Antioch, and others.

The second part, concerning issues pertaining to the laity, such as family law, debt, civil administration etc., also drew on these sources, but is attributed in large part to four books referred to as the Canons of the Emperors (Arabic Qawānīn al-mulūk). Various scholars have identified these books as:

1. The Procheiron (also known as Procheiros Nomos), a Byzantine law code enacted by Emperor Basil the Macedonian between 870 and 878;
2. The Arabic version of a work commonly known as the Syro-Roman Law Book, originally written in Greek around 480;
3. The Arabic version of the Ekloge ton nomon, another Byzantine law code published by Emperor Leo III the Isaurian and his son in 726;
4. Precepts of the Old Testament, a collection of the Torah laws with some Christian commentary.

Ibn al-Assal's work is heavily influenced by Roman law, the first three of these sources being themselves strongly influenced by the Justinianic Code and earlier law codes. It was originally titled Collection of Canons, but the Arabic version is more commonly known as The Nomocanon of Ibn al-Assal. It was intended to be used by the Coptic Christians of Egypt, who regarded it as authoritative.

== Later history ==
There are a few historical records claiming that this law code was translated into Ge'ez and entered Ethiopia around 1450 in the reign of Zara Yaqob. Even so, its first recorded use in the function of a constitution (supreme law of the land) is with Sarsa Dengel beginning in 1563.

This Ge'ez edition, ascribed to Petros Abda Sayd, is a loose translation of Ibn al-Assal's original, and even diverges significantly in a few places where Petros evidently had some difficulty with the Arabic. Scholars have stated that the first section (the Ecclesiastical law) was already in use in Ethiopia before this time as part of the Senodos, and that the title Fetha Negest, Laws of the Kings, referred to the second (lay) part, that was new to Ethiopia.

The Fetha Negest remained officially the supreme law in Ethiopia until 1931, when a modern-style Constitution was first granted by Emperor Haile Selassie I. A completely modernised penal code had already been introduced in 1930. Earlier, in 1921, shortly after becoming Regent, but before being crowned as Emperor, Haile Selassie I had directed that certain "cruel and unusual" punishments mandated in the Fetha, such as amputation of hands for conviction of theft, be made to cease entirely. However punitive enslavement remained as a punishment for crimes such as murder, rape, and unpaid debts. Though Ethiopia's 1930 Penal Code replaced the criminal provisions of the Fetha Negest, the latter document provided the starting point for the code, along with several new penal codes.

== Influence ==
The Fetha Negest has had a great influence on Ethiopia. It has been an educational resource for centuries and is still consulted in matters of law in the present era. In 1960, when the government enacted the civil code of Ethiopia, it cited the Fetha Negest as an inspiration to the codification commission.

== See also ==
- Kebra Nagast
