= Casimir Mondon-Vidailhet =

French journalist, philologist and author

Casimir Mondon-Vidailhet (February 1, 1847 - November 30, 1910) was a French journalist, philologist and author.

== Life ==
François Marie Casimir Mondon-Vidailhet was born in Saint-Gaudens, in Haute-Garonne.

He was journalist for Le Temps. In this role, he left France for Ethiopia in 1891, and stayed there from 1892 to 1893 and from 1894 to 1897.

He was professor at École nationale des langues orientales vivantes, where he was the first occupant of the chair of Amharic, which he taught from 1898 to 1910. He was succeeded by Marcel Cohen.

== Works ==
Works by Mondon-Vidailhet include:

- Over 65 articles published in Le Temps between 1892 and 1910
- Mondon-Vidailhet, Casimir (1891). Manuel pratique de langue abyssine (amharique) a l'usage des explorateurs et des commerçants. Paris: Imprimerie nationale. hdl:2027/nnc1.cu58859420.
- Mondon-Vidailhet, Casimir (1902). La langue Harari et les dialectes Ethiopies du Gouraghê. Paris: Imprimerie nationale.
- Mondon-Vidailhet, Casimir (2003). "La musique éthiopienne". Annales d'Éthiopie (in French). 19: 149–187. ISSN 2077-0820. (reprint of posthumous 1922 article)

== See also ==
- Ethiopian manuscript collections
- Harari language
