= Lanfranco Ricci =

Italian Ethiopianist

Lanfranco Ricci (25 March 1916 - 15 December 2007) was an Italian Ethiopianist.

== Life ==
Born in Belgirate, in 1952 Ricci became professor of Amharic language and literature at the Istituto Universitario Orientale of Naples.

In 1970 Ricci published an Italian translation of the hagiography of the 17th-century female saint Walatta Petros, within the Corpus Scriptorum Christianorum Orientalium series. He based his translation on Carlo Conti Rossini's 1912 print edition, which has been criticized for its over-reliance on a single Paris manuscript.

In 1973 Ricci began archaeological research in Aksum, which would continue for two years.

A Festschrift in Ricci's honour was published in 1994. In 1997 he was elected a corresponding fellow of the British Academy.

== Works ==
- 'Ethiopian Christian Literature', in Aziz S. Atiya, ed., The Coptic Encyclopedia, vol. 3. New York, 1991, pp. 975-79.
