= Marcel Cohen =

French linguist

Marcel Samuel Raphaël Cohen (February 6, 1884 – November 5, 1974) was a French linguist. He was an important scholar of Semitic languages and especially of Ethiopian languages. He studied the French language and contributed much to general linguistics.

== Life ==
Marcel Cohen was born in Paris. He studied at the Lycée Condorcet. He attended Antoine Meillet's lectures at the Collège de France and the École pratique des hautes études. In 1905 he registered at the École des langues orientales and graduated in 1909. He studied Amharic (under Mondon-Vidailhet), French linguistics, Sanskrit, Ge'ez and South Arabian. He wrote his thesis on the Arabic dialect of the Jews of Algiers (Le parler arabe des juifs d'Alger). Between March 1910 and June 1911, he undertook a journey to Ethiopia in which he collected much material on Ethiopian languages. He succeeded Mondon-Vidailhet, who had just died, as chargé de cours d'Abyssin at the École des langues orientales. In 1916 he became Assistant Professor and in 1926 a full Professor. In 1919 he also became professor of Ethiopic at the École pratique des hautes études. He had several students who became distinguished éthiopisants, such as: Wolf Leslau, Stefan Strelcyn and Joseph Tubiana.

== Works ==
- 1912: Le parler arabe des Juifs d'Alger. Paris: Champion.
- 1912: Rapport sur une mission linguistique en Abyssinie (1910-1911). Paris: Imprimerie Nationale.
- 1920: Documents ethnographiques d'Abyssinie. Paris: Leroux.
- 1921: "La prononciation traditionelle du Guèze (éthiopien classique)", in: Journal asiatique Sér. 11 / T. 18 (electronic version in Gallica digital library of the Bibliothèque nationale de France PDF).
- 1924: Couplets amhariques du Choa. Paris: Imprimerie Nationale.
- 1924: Le système verbal sémitique et l'expression du temps. Paris: Leroux.
- 1924: (with Antoine Meillet) Les langues du monde. Paris: Champion. (2nd ed. 1952)
- 1931: Etudes d'éthiopien méridional. Paris: Geuthner.
- 1934: Documents sudarabiques. Paris: dépôt chez Adrien Maisonneuve.
- 1936: Traité de langue amharique. Paris: Institut d'Ethnographie. (reprinted: 1970, 1995 ISBN 2-85265-016-9)
- 1939: Nouvelles études d'éthiopien meridional. Paris: Champion.
- 1947: Essai comparatif sur le vocabulaire et la phonétique chamito-sémitique. Paris: Champion.
- 1947: Histoire d'une langue: le français. Paris: Editions Réunis. (4th ed., Editions Sociales 1974)
- 1950: Regards sur la langue française. Paris: Editions Sociales.
- 1950: Le langage: structure et évolution. Paris: Editions Sociales.
- 1954: Grammaire et style.
- 1958: La grande invention de l'écriture et son évolution. Paris: Klincksieck.
- 1962: Etudes sur le langage de l'enfant. Paris: Editions du Scarabée.
- 1963: Nouveaux regards sur la langue française.
- 1963: Encore des regards sur la langue française.
- 1970: Toujours des regards sur la langue française.
- 1972: Une fois de plus des regards sur la langue française. Paris: Editions Sociales.

== See also ==
- Wolf Leslau
