= August Dillmann =

German orientalist and biblical scholar (1823–1894)

Christian Friedrich August Dillmann
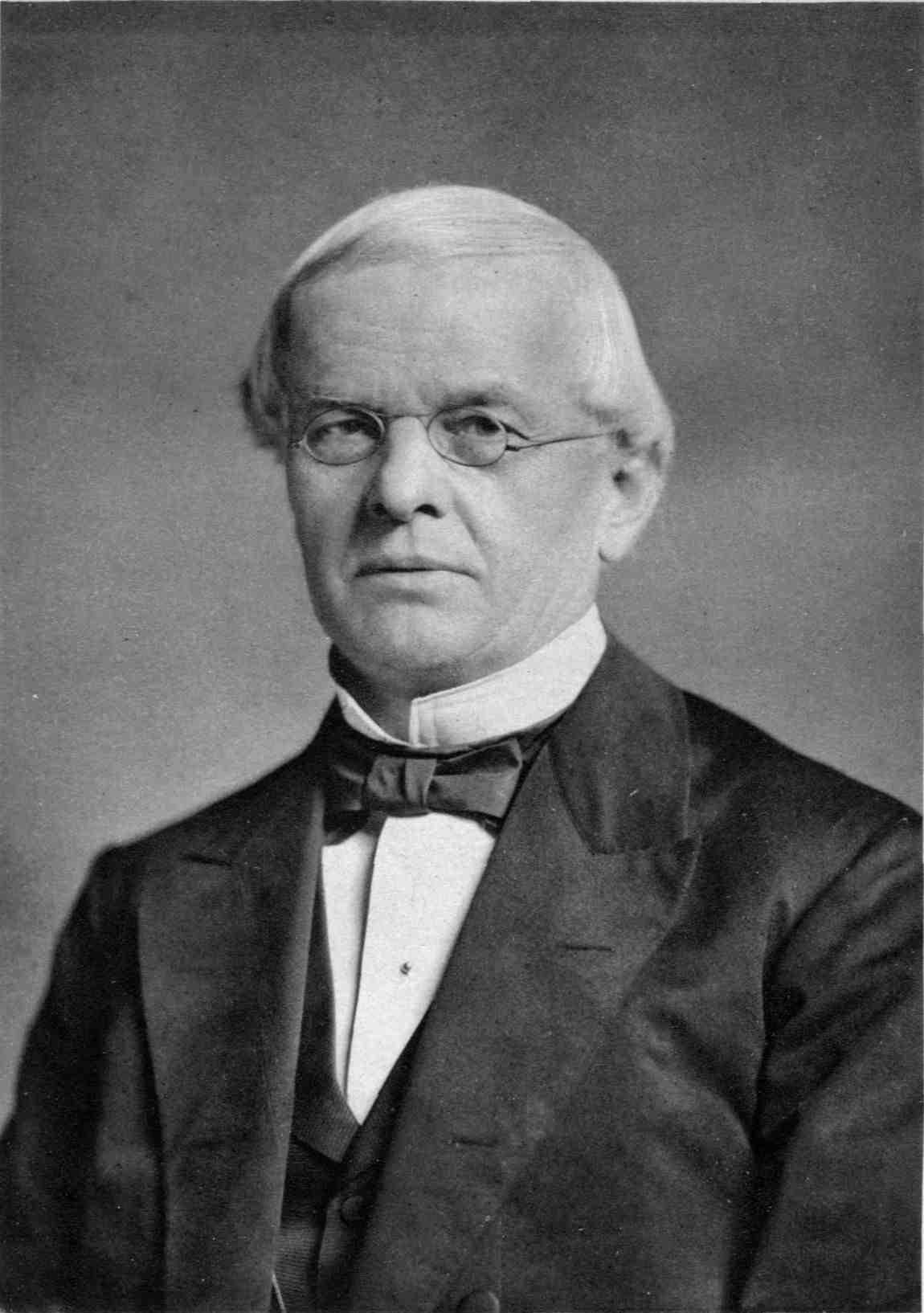
- Born: 25 April 1823; Illingen, German Confederation
- Died: 7 July 1894 (aged 71); Berlin, German Empire
- Education: University of Tübingen
- Occupations: Orientalist and biblical scholar

Signature
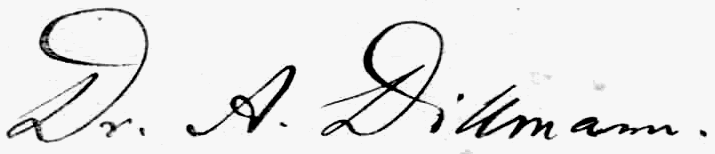

Christian Friedrich August Dillmann (25 April 1823 – 7 July 1894) was a German orientalist and biblical scholar.

== Life ==
The son of a Württemberg schoolmaster, he was born at Illingen. He was educated at the University of Tübingen, where he became a pupil and friend of Heinrich Ewald, and studied under Ferdinand Christian Baur, though he did not join the new Tübingen school. For a short time, he worked as pastor at Sersheim, near his native place, but he soon came to feel that his studies demanded his whole time.

He devoted himself to the study of Ethiopic manuscripts in the libraries of Paris, London and Oxford, and this work caused a revival of Ethiopic study in the 19th century. In 1847 and 1848, he prepared catalogues of the Ethiopic manuscripts in the British Museum (now the British Library) and the Bodleian Library at Oxford. He then set to work upon an edition of the Ethiopic Bible.

Returning to Tübingen in 1848, in 1853, he was appointed professor extraordinarius. Subsequently, he became professor of philosophy at the University of Kiel (1854), and of theology in Giessen (1864) and Berlin (1869), where he succeeded Ernst Wilhelm Hengstenberg.

== Works ==
In 1851, he had published the "Book of Enoch" in Ethiopian (German, 1853; English, 1893), and at Kiel, he completed the first part of the Ethiopic Bible, Octateuchus Aethiopicus (1853–55). In 1857 appeared his Grammatik der äthiopischen Sprache (2nd edition by Carl Bezold, 1899); in 1859 the "Book of Jubilees"; in 1861 and 1871 another part of the Ethiopic bible, Libri Regum; in 1865 his great Lexicon linguæ aethiopicæ; in 1866 his Chrestomathia aethiopica. In 1853, Dillmann published an article comparing Ethiopian king lists.

Always a theologian at heart, he returned to theology in 1864. His Giessen lectures were published under the titles, Ursprung der alttestamentlichen Religion (1865) and Die Propheten des alten Bundes nach ihrer politischen Wirksamkeit (1868). In 1869 appeared his commentary on Hiob, (4th edition 1891) which stamped him as one of the foremost Old Testament exegetes.

His renown as a theologian was mainly founded on the series of commentaries, based on those of August Wilhelm Knobel's Die Genesis (Leipzig, 1875); Die Bücher Exodus und Leviticus, 1880; Die Bücher Numeri, Deuteronomium und Josua, with a dissertation on the origin of the Hexateuch, 1886; Der Prophet Jesaja, 1890. In 1877 he published the "Ascension of Isaiah" in Ethiopian and Latin. He was also a contributor to Daniel Schenkel's Bibellexikon, Brockhaus's Conversationslexikon, and Johann Jakob Herzog's Realencyklopädie. His book on Old Testament theology, Handbuch der alttestamentlichen Theologie, was published by Rudolf Kittel in 1895.
