= Geʽez =

Ancient South Semitic language

- ግዕዝ Gəʽ(ə)z
- Pronunciation: [ˈɡɨʕ(ɨ)z]
- Native to: Eritrea, Ethiopia
- Extinct: Before 10th century to 14th century Remains in use as a liturgical language.
- Language family: Afro-Asiatic: Semitic; West Semitic; South Semitic; Ethiopic; North; Geʽez
- Writing system: Geʽez script, Ancient South Arabian script

Official status
- Official language in: Liturgical language of the Eritrean Orthodox Tewahedo Church, Ethiopian Orthodox Tewahedo Church, Eritrean Catholic Church, Ethiopian Catholic Church, and Beta Israel

Language codes
- ISO 639-2: gez
- ISO 639-3: gez
- Glottolog: geez1241

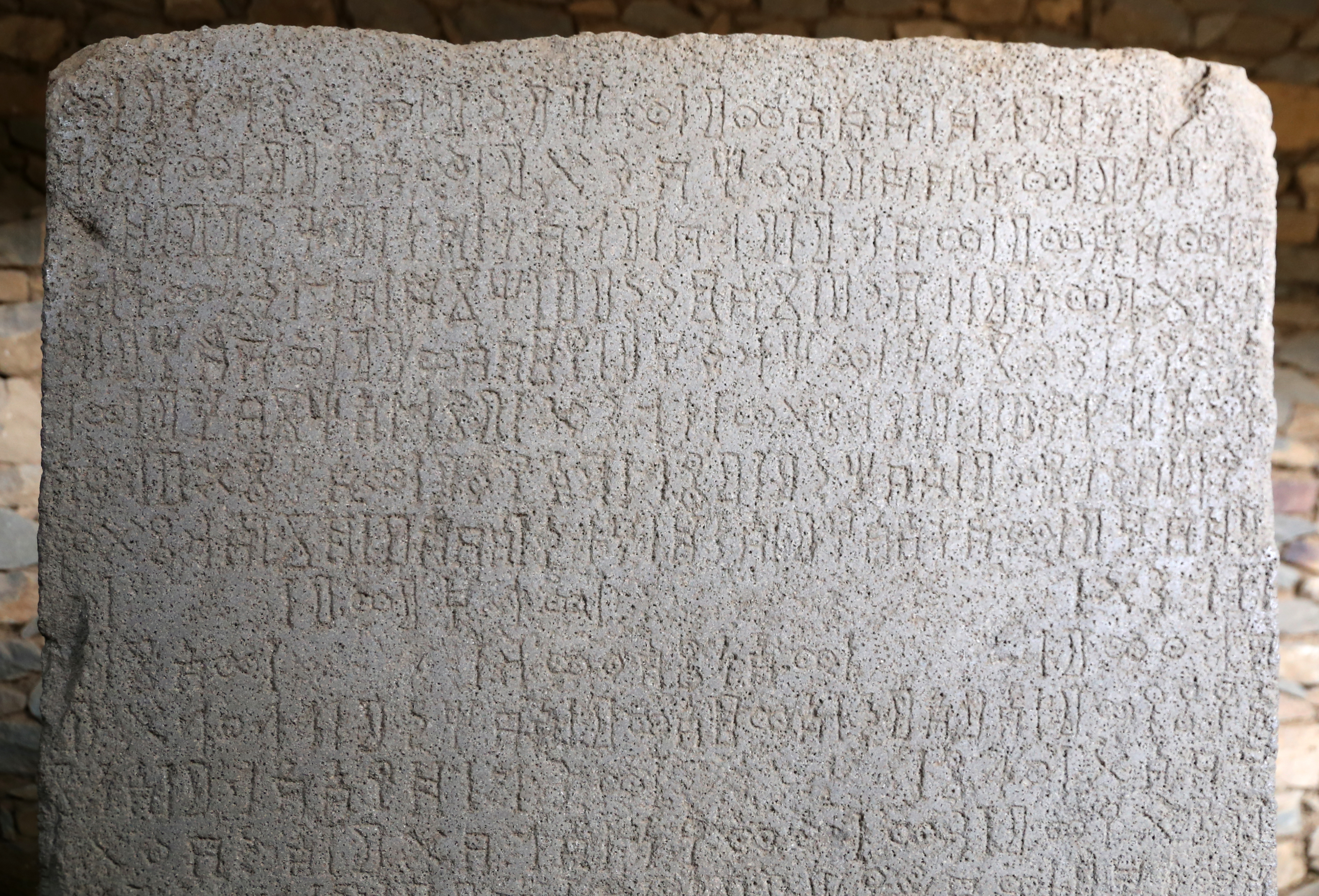
Ezana stone, written in Geʽez explaining King Ezana's conquests and accomplishments

Geʽez (/ˈɡiːɛz/ or /ɡiːˈɛz/; ግዕዝ Gəʽ(ə)z [ˈɡɨʕ(ɨ)z]), sometimes referred to in scholarly literature as Classical Ethiopic, is an ancient South Semitic language. The language originates from what is now Ethiopia and Eritrea.

As of today, Geʽez is used as the main liturgical language of the Ethiopian Orthodox Tewahedo Church, the Eritrean Orthodox Tewahedo Church, the Ethiopian Catholic Church, the Eritrean Catholic Church, and the Beta Israel Jewish community.

The first inscription of Ge'ez is from the Hawulti Obelisk in the historic region of Akele Guzay. It is an ancient pre-Aksumite obelisk located in ancient city of Metera in Eritrea. The monument dates tentatively to circa 400 CE in the early Aksumite period and bears the first known example of the ancient Geʽez script.

In one study, Tigre (language spoken in Northern Eritrea) was found to have a 71% lexical similarity to Geʽez, while Tigrinya had a 68% lexical similarity to Geʽez, followed by Amharic at 62%. Most linguists believe that Geʽez does not constitute a common ancestor of modern Ethio-Semitic languages but became a separate language early on from another hypothetical unattested common language.

== Phonology ==
=== Vowels ===
Geʽez vowels
Type	Front	Central	Back
Close	/i/ i	/ɨ/ ə	/u/ u
Mid	/e/ e		/o/ o
Near-open	/æ~ɐ/ (Note: /æ/ in the Amharic liturgical pronunciation, or /ɐ/ (as in Tigrinya).) a		
Open		/a~ɑ/ (Note: According to Lambdin.) ā	

Historically, /ɨ/ has a basic correspondence with Proto-Semitic short *i and *u, /æ ~ ɐ/ with short *a, the vowels /i, u, a/ with Proto-Semitic long *ī, *ū, *ā respectively, and /e, o/ with the Proto-Semitic diphthongs *ay and *aw. In Geʽez there still exist many alternations between /o/ and /aw/, less so between /e/ and /aj/, e.g. ተሎኩ taloku ~ ተለውኩ talawku ("I followed").

In the transcription employed by the Encyclopaedia Aethiopica, which is widely employed in academia, the contrast here represented as a/ā is represented as ä/a.

=== Consonants ===
==== Transliteration ====
Geʽez is transliterated according to the following system (see the phoneme table below for IPA values):

translit.	h	l	ḥ	m	ś	r	s	q	b	t	ḫ	n	ʼ
Geʽez	ሀ	ለ	ሐ	መ	ሠ	ረ	ሰ	ቀ	በ	ተ	ኀ	ነ	አ

translit.	k	w	ʽ	z	y	d	g	ṭ	p̣	ṣ	ḍ	f	p
Geʽez	ከ	ወ	ዐ	ዘ	የ	ደ	ገ	ጠ	ጰ	ጸ	ፀ	ፈ	ፐ

Because Geʽez is no longer spoken in daily life by large communities, the early pronunciation of some consonants is not completely certain. Gragg writes that "[t]he consonants corresponding to the graphemes ś (Geʽez ሠ) and ḍ (Geʽez ፀ) have merged with ሰ and ጸ respectively in the phonological system represented by the traditional pronunciation—and indeed in all modern Ethiopian Semitic. ... There is, however, no evidence either in the tradition or in Ethiopian Semitic [for] what value these consonants may have had in Geʽez."

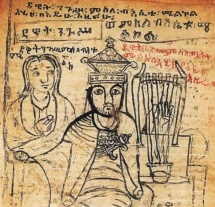
A verse from the book of Psalms written in Geʽez

A similar problem is found for the consonant transliterated ḫ. Gragg notes that it corresponds in etymology to velar or uvular fricatives in other Semitic languages, but it is pronounced exactly the same as ḥ in the traditional pronunciation. Though the use of a different letter shows that it must originally have had some other pronunciation, what that pronunciation was is not certain.

The chart below lists /ɬ/ and /t͡ɬʼ/ as possible values for ś (ሠ) and ḍ (ፀ) respectively. It also lists /x/ as a possible value for ḫ (ኀ); /χ/ is also possible. These values are tentative, but based on the reconstructed Proto-Semitic consonants that they are descended from.

==== Phonemes of Geʽez ====
The following table presents the consonants of the Geʽez language. The reconstructed phonetic value of a phoneme is given in IPA transcription, followed by its representation in the Geʽez script and scholarly transliteration.

Geʽez consonants
Type		Labial	Alveolar			Palatal	Velar		Pharyngeal	Glottal
Type		Labial	median		lateral	Palatal	plain	labialized	Pharyngeal	Glottal
Nasal		/m/ መ m	/n/ ነ n							
Stop/ Affricate	voiceless	/p/ ፐ p	/t/ ተ t				/k/ ከ k	/kʷ/ ኰ kʷ		/ʔ/ አ ʼ
Stop/ Affricate	voiced	/b/ በ b	/d/ ደ d				/g/ ገ g	/gʷ/ ጐ gʷ		/ʔ/ አ ʼ
Stop/ Affricate	emphatic (Note: The emphatic consonants of Geʽez were likely realized as ejectives, as in the modern Ethiopian Semitic languages.)	/pʼ/ ጰ p̣	/t’/ ጠ ṭ	/t͡sʼ/ ጸ ṣ	/t͡ɬʼ/ ፀ ḍ		/k’/ ቀ q	/kʷ’/ ቈ qʷ		/ʔ/ አ ʼ
Fricative	voiceless	/f/ ፈ f	/s/ ሰ s		/ɬ/ ሠ ś		/x/ ኀ ḫ	/xʷ/ ኈ ḫʷ	/ħ/ ሐ ḥ	/h/ ሀ h
Fricative	voiced		/z/ ዘ z						/ʕ/ ዐ ʽ	
Approximant			/r/ ረ r		/l/ ለ l	/j/ የ y		/w/ ወ w		

==== Geʽez consonants in relation to Proto-Semitic ====
Geʽez consonants have a triple opposition between voiceless, voiced, and ejective (or emphatic) obstruents. The Proto-Semitic "emphasis" in Geʽez has been generalized to include emphatic p̣ /pʼ/. Geʽez has phonologized labiovelars, descending from Proto-Semitic biphonemes. Geʽez ś ሠ Sawt (in Amharic, also called śe-nigūś, i.e. the se letter used for spelling the word nigūś "king") is reconstructed as descended from a Proto-Semitic voiceless lateral fricative [ɬ]. Like Arabic, Geʽez merged Proto-Semitic š and s in ሰ (also called se-isat: the se letter used for spelling the word isāt "fire"). Apart from this, Geʽez phonology is comparably conservative; the only other Proto-Semitic phonological contrasts lost may be the interdental fricatives and ghayn.

=== Stress ===
There is no evidence within the script of stress rules in the ancient period, but stress patterns exist within the liturgical tradition(s). Accounts of these patterns are, however, contradictory. One early 20th-century account may be broadly summarized as follows:

- primary stress only falls on the ultima (the last syllable) or the penult (the second-to-last syllable)
- in finite verbs (including the imperative), stress falls on the penult: ቀተለት qatálat ("she killed"), ንግር nə́gər ("speak!", masculine singular), with the important exception of the 2nd-person feminine plural suffix ክን -kə́n
- in nouns and adjectives (in citation form), and most adverbs, stress falls on the ultima: ንጉሥ nəgúś ("king"), ሀገር hagár ("city"), ግዕዝ Gə́ʽz ("Geʽez"), ጠቢብ ṭabíb ("wise"), ህየ həyyá ("there"); an exception among adverbs is ዝየ zə́ya ("here")
- the suffix -a, marking the construct state or the accusative case (or both), is not stressed: ንጉሠ nəgúśa, ሀገረ hagára, ግዕዘ Gə́ʽza, ጠቢበ ṭabíba
- cardinal numbers are stressed on the ultima, even in the accusative, e.g. ሠለስቱ śalastú accusative ሠለስተ śalastá ("three")
- pronouns have rather unpredictable stress, so stress is learned for each form
- enclitic particles (such as ሰ -(ə)ssá) are stressed
- various grammatical words (short prepositions, conjunctions) and short nouns in the construct state are unstressed

As one example of a discrepancy, a different late 19th-century account says the masculine singular imperative is stressed on the ultima (e.g. ንግር nəgə́r, "speak!"), and that, in some patterns, words can be stressed on the third-, fourth- or even fifth-to-last syllable (e.g. በረከተ bárakata).

Due to the high predictability of stress location in most words, textbooks, dictionaries and grammars generally do not mark it. Minimal pairs do exist, however, such as yənaggərā́ ("he speaks to her", with the pronoun suffix -(h)ā́ "her") vs. yənaggə́rā ("they speak", feminine plural), both written ይነግራ.

== Morphology ==
=== Nouns ===
Geʽez distinguishes two genders, masculine and feminine, the latter of which is sometimes marked with the suffix ት -t, e.g. እኅት ʼəxt ("sister"). These are less strongly distinguished than in other Semitic languages, as many nouns not denoting humans can be used in either gender: in translated Christian texts there is even a tendency for nouns to follow the gender of the noun with a corresponding meaning in Greek.

There are two numbers, singular and plural. The plural can be constructed either by suffixing ኣት -āt to a word (regardless of gender, but often ኣን -ān if it is a male human noun), or by using an internal plural.

- Plural using suffix: ዓመት ʿāmat ("year") plural ዓመታት ʿāmatāt, ገዳም gadām ("wilderness, uninhabited area") plural ገዳማት gadāmāt, ሊቅ liq ("elder, chief") plural ሊቃን liqān, ጳጳስ p̣āp̣p̣ās ("(arch)bishop") plural ጳጳሳት p̣āp̣p̣āsāt.
- Internal plural: ቤት bet ("house") plural አብያት ʾabyāt, ቅርንብ qərnəb ("eyelid") plural ቀራንብት qarānəbt.

Nouns also have two cases: the nominative, which is not marked, and the accusative, which is marked with final -a. As in other Semitic languages, there are at least two "states", absolute (unmarked) and construct (marked with -a as well).

Declension of ሊቅ liq ("elder, chief")
	Singular		Plural	
	Absolute state	Construct state	Absolute state	Construct state
Nominative	ሊቅ liq	ሊቀ liqa	ሊቃን liqān	ሊቃነ liqāna
Accusative	ሊቀ liqa	ሊቀ liqa	ሊቃነ liqāna	ሊቃነ liqāna

As in Classical/Standard Arabic, singular and plural nouns often take the same final inflectional affixes for case and state, as number morphology is achieved via attaching a suffix to the stem and/or an internal change in the stem.

There is some morphological interaction between consonant-final nouns and a pronoun suffix (see the table of suffix pronouns below). For example, when followed by የ -ya ("my"), in both nominative and accusative the resulting form is ሊቅየ liqə́ya (i.e. the accusative is not *ሊቀየ *liqáya), but with ከ -ka ("your", masculine singular) there's a distinction between nominative ሊቅከ liqə́ka and accusative ሊቀከ liqáka, and similarly with -hu ("his") between nominative ሊቁ liqú (< *liq-ə-hu) and accusative ሊቆ liqó (< *liqa-hu).

==== Internal plural ====
Internal plurals follow certain patterns. Triconsonantal nouns follow one of the following patterns.

Patterns of internal plural for triconsonantal nouns (C=Consonant, V=Vowel)
Pattern	Singular	Meaning	Plural
ʾaCCāC	ልብስ ləbs	'garment'	አልባስ ʾalbās
ʾaCCāC	ፈረስ faras	'horse'	አፍራስ ʾafrās
ʾaCCāC	ቤት bet	'house'	አብያት ʾabyāt
ʾaCCāC	ጾም ṣom	'fast'	አጽዋም ʾaṣwām
ʾaCCāC	ስም səm	'name'	አስማት ʾasmāt
ʾaCCuC	ሀገር hagar	'country'	አህጉር ʾahgur
ʾaCCuC	አድግ ʾadg	'ass'	አእዱግ ʾaʾdug
ʾaCCəC(t)	በትር batr	'rod'	አብትር ʾabtər
ʾaCCəC(t)	ርእስ rə's	'head'	አርእስት ʾarʾəst
ʾaCCəC(t)	ገብር gabr	'servant, slave'	አግብርት ʾagbərt
ʾaCāCəC(t)	በግዕ bagʽ	'sheep'	አባግዕ ’abāgəʽ
ʾaCāCəC(t)	ጋንን gānən	'devil'	አጋንንት ’agānənt
CVCaC	እዝን ’əzn	'ear'	እዘን ’əzan
CVCaC	እግር ’əgr	'foot'	እገር ’əgar
CVCaw	እድ ’əd	'hand'	እደው ’ədaw
CVCaw	አብ ’ab	'father'	አበው ’abaw
CVCaw	እኍ/እኅው ’əḫʷ/’əḫəw	'brother'	አኀው ’aḫaw

Quadriconsonantal and some triconsonantal nouns follow the following pattern. Triconsonantal nouns that take this pattern must have at least one "long" vowel (namely /i e o u/).

Patterns of internal plural for quadriconsonantal nouns (C=Consonant, V=Vowel)
Pattern	Meaning	Singular	Plural
CaCāCəC(t)	'virgin'	ድንግል dəngəl	ደናግል danāgəl
CaCāCəC(t)	'prince'	መስፍን masfən	መሳፍንት masāfənt
CaCāCəC(t)	'star'	ኮከብ kokab	ከዋክብት kawākəbt
CaCāCəC(t)	'window'	መስኮት maskot	መሳኩት masākut < masākəwt
CaCāCəC(t)	'chicken'	ዶርሆ dorho	ደራውህ darāwəh
CaCāCəC(t)	'night'	ሌሊት lelit	ለያልይ layāləy
CaCāCəC(t)	'earth'	ብሔር bəḥer	በሓውርት baḥāwərt
CaCāCəC(t)	'river'	ውሒዝ wəḥiz	ወሓይዝት waḥāyəzt
CaCāCəC(t)	'priest'	ቀሲስ qasis	ቀሳውስት qasāwəst

=== Pronominal morphology ===
In the independent pronouns, gender is not distinguished in the 1st person, and case is only distinguished in the 3rd person singular.

Personal independent pronouns
			Singular	Plural
1st person			አነ ʼána	ንሕነ nə́ḥna
2nd person	masculine		አንተ ʼánta	አንትሙ ʼantə́mu
2nd person	feminine		አንቲ ʼánti	አንትን ʼantə́n
3rd person	masculine	nominative	ውእቱ wəʼə́tu	ውእቶሙ wəʼətómu, እሙንቱ ʼəmuntú
3rd person	masculine	accusative	ውእተ wəʼə́ta	ውእቶሙ wəʼətómu, እሙንቱ ʼəmuntú
3rd person	feminine	nominative	ይእቲ yəʼə́ti	ውእቶን wəʼətón, እማንቱ ʼəmāntú
3rd person	feminine	accusative	ይእተ yə’ə́ta	ውእቶን wəʼətón, እማንቱ ʼəmāntú

Suffix pronouns attach at the end of a noun, preposition or verb. The accusative/construct -a is lost when a plural noun with a consonant-final stem has a pronoun suffix attached (generally replaced by the added -i-, as in -i-hu, "his"), thereby losing the case/state distinction, but the distinction may be retained in the case of consonant-final singular nouns. Furthermore, suffix pronouns may or may not attract stress to themselves. In the following table, pronouns without a stress mark (an acute) are not stressed, and vowel-initial suffixes have also been given the base በ /b/ in the script.

Suffix pronouns
			Default		With consonant-final singular nouns		With consonant-final plural nouns
			noun/prep.	verb	nominative	accusative	With consonant-final plural nouns
Singular	1st person		-የ -ya	-ኒ -ni	-ብየ -ə́ya		-ብየ -ə́ya, -ቢየ -íya (Note: -ቢየ -íya is a variant mostly found in older manuscripts.)
Singular	2nd person	masculine	-ከ -ka		-ብከ -ə́ka	-በከ -áka	-ቢከ -íka
Singular	2nd person	feminine	-ኪ -ki		-ብኪ -ə́ki	-በኪ -áki	-ቢኪ -íki, -ብኪ -ə́ki (Note: These two forms are in free variation.)
Singular	3rd person	masculine	ሁ -hú		-ቡ -ú	-ቦ -ó	-ቢሁ -ihú
Singular	3rd person	feminine	-ሃ -hā́		-ባ -ā́		-ቢሃ -ihā́
Plural	1st person		-ነ -na		-ብነ -ə́na	-በነ -ána	-ቢነ -ína
Plural	2nd person	masculine	-ክሙ -kə́mu		-ብክሙ -əkə́mu	-በክሙ -akə́mu	-ቢክሙ -ikə́mu
Plural	2nd person	feminine	-ክን -kə́n		-ብክን -əkə́n	-በክን -akə́n	-ቢክን -ikə́n
Plural	3rd person	masculine	-ሆሙ -hómu		-ቦሙ -ómu		-ቢሆሙ -ihómu
Plural	3rd person	feminine	-ሆን -hón		-ቦን -ón		-ቢሆን -ihón

=== Verb conjugation ===
Person			Perfect qatal-nn	Imperfect	
Person			Perfect qatal-nn	Indicative -qattəl	Jussive -qtəl
1st person		singular	qatal-ku	ʾə-qattəl	ʾə-qtəl
1st person		plural	qatal-na	nə-qattəl	nə-qtəl
2nd person	masculine	singular	qatal-ka	tə-qattəl	tə-qtəl
2nd person	masculine	plural	qatal-kəmmu	tə-qattəl-u	tə-qtəl-u
2nd person	feminine	singular	qatal-ki	tə-qattəl-i	tə-qtəl-i
2nd person	feminine	plural	qatal-kən	tə-qattəl-ā	tə-qtəl-ā
3rd person	masculine	singular	qatal-a	yə-qattəl	yə-qtəl
3rd person	masculine	plural	qatal-u	yə-qattəl-u	yə-qtəl-u
3rd person	feminine	singular	qatal-at	tə-qattəl	tə-qtəl
3rd person	feminine	plural	qatal-ā	yə-qattəl-ā	yə-qtəl-ā

== Syntax ==
=== Noun phrases ===
Noun phrases have the following overall order:

(demonstratives) noun (adjective)-(relative clause)

በዛ ሀገር
ba-zā hagar
in-this:F city
in this city

ንጉሥ ክቡር
nəguś kəbur
king glorious
a/the glorious king

Adjectives and determiners agree with the noun in gender and number:

ዛቲ ንግሥት ክብርት
zāti nəgəśt kəbərt
this:FEM queen glorious:FEM
this glorious queen

እሉ ነገሥት ክቡራን
ʼəllu nagaśt kəburān
these:M.PL kings glorious:PL
these glorious kings

Relative clauses are introduced by a pronoun which agrees in gender and number with the preceding noun:

ብእሲ ዘቀተልዎ ለወልዱ
bəʾsi za=qatal-əww-o la=wald-u
man which:MASC=kill-3.M.PL-3.M.SG to=son=3.M.SG
the man whose son they killed

As in many Semitic languages, possession by a noun phrase is shown through the construct state. In Geʽez, this is formed by suffixing the construct suffix -a to the possessed noun, which is followed by the possessor, as in the following examples:

ወልደ ንጉሥ
wald-a nəguś
son-construct king
the son of the king

ስመ መልአክ
səm-a malʼak
name-construct angel
the name of the angel

Another common way of indicating possession by a noun phrase combines the pronominal suffix on a noun with the possessor preceded by the preposition /la=/ 'to, for':

ስሙ ለንጉሥ
səm-u la=nəguś
name-3SG to=king
'the king's name; the name of the king'

Lambdin notes that in comparison to the construct state, this kind of possession is only possible when the possessor is definite and specific. Lambdin also notes that the construct state is the unmarked form of possession in Geʽez.

=== Prepositional phrases ===
Geʽez is a prepositional language, as in the following example:

ውስተ ሀገር
wəsta hagar
to city
to the city

There are three special prepositions, /ba=/ 'in, with', /la=/ 'to, for', /ʼəm=/ 'from', which always appear as clitics, as in the following examples:

እምሀገር
ʼəm=hagar
from=city
from the city

በሀገር
ba=hagar
in=city
in the city

እምዲበ ደብር
’əm=diba dabr
from=on mountain
down from the mountain

በዝ ቤት
ba=zə bet
in=this house
in this house

These proclitic prepositions in Geʽez are similar to the Hebrew inseparable prepositions.

=== Sentences ===
The normal word order for declarative sentences is VSO. Objects of verbs show accusative case marked with the suffix /-a/:

ተከለ ብእሲ ዕፀ
takal-a bəʾsi ʿəḍ-a
plant-3.M.SG man tree-ACC
The man planted a tree

Questions with a wh-word ('who', 'what', etc.) show the question word at the beginning of the sentence:

አየ ሀገረ ሐነጹ
ʾayy-a hagar-a ḥanaṣ-u
which-ACC city-ACC build-3.M.PL
Which city did they build?

=== Negation ===
The common way of negation is the prefix ኢ ʾi- which descends from ʾəy- (which is attested in Axum inscriptions), from earlier *ʾay, from Proto-Semitic *ʾal by palatalization. It is prefixed to verbs as follows:

ንሕነ ኢንክል ሐዊረ
nəḥna ʾi-nəkl ḥawira
we {(we) cannot} go
we cannot go

== Writing system ==
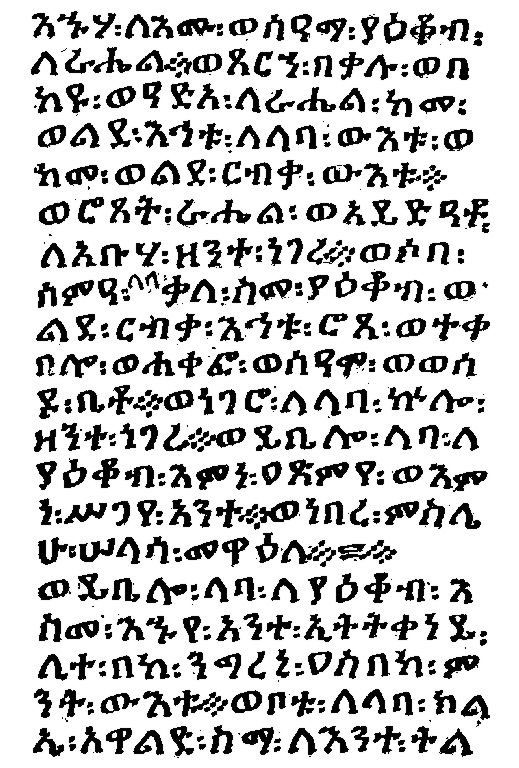
Genesis 29.11–16 in Geʽez

Geʽez is written with Ethiopic or the Geʽez abugida, a script that was originally developed specifically for this language. In languages that use it, such as Amharic and Tigrinya, the script is called Fidäl, which means script or alphabet.

Geʽez is read from left to right.

The Geʽez script has been adapted to write other languages, usually ones that are also Semitic. The most widespread use is for Amharic in Ethiopia and Tigrinya in Eritrea and Ethiopia. It is also used for Sebatbeit, Meʼen, Agew, and most other languages of Ethiopia. In Eritrea it is used for Tigre, and it is often used for Bilen, a Cushitic language. Some other languages in the Horn of Africa, such as Oromo, used to be written using Geʽez but have switched to Latin-based alphabets. It also uses four series of consonant signs for labialized velar consonants, which are variants of the non-labialized velar consonants:

Basic sign	q(a)	ḫ(a)	k(a)	g(a)
Basic sign	ቀ	ኀ	ከ	ገ
Labialized variant	qʷ(a)	ḫʷ(a)	kʷ(a)	gʷ(a)
Labialized variant	ቈ	ኈ	ኰ	ጐ

== History and literature ==
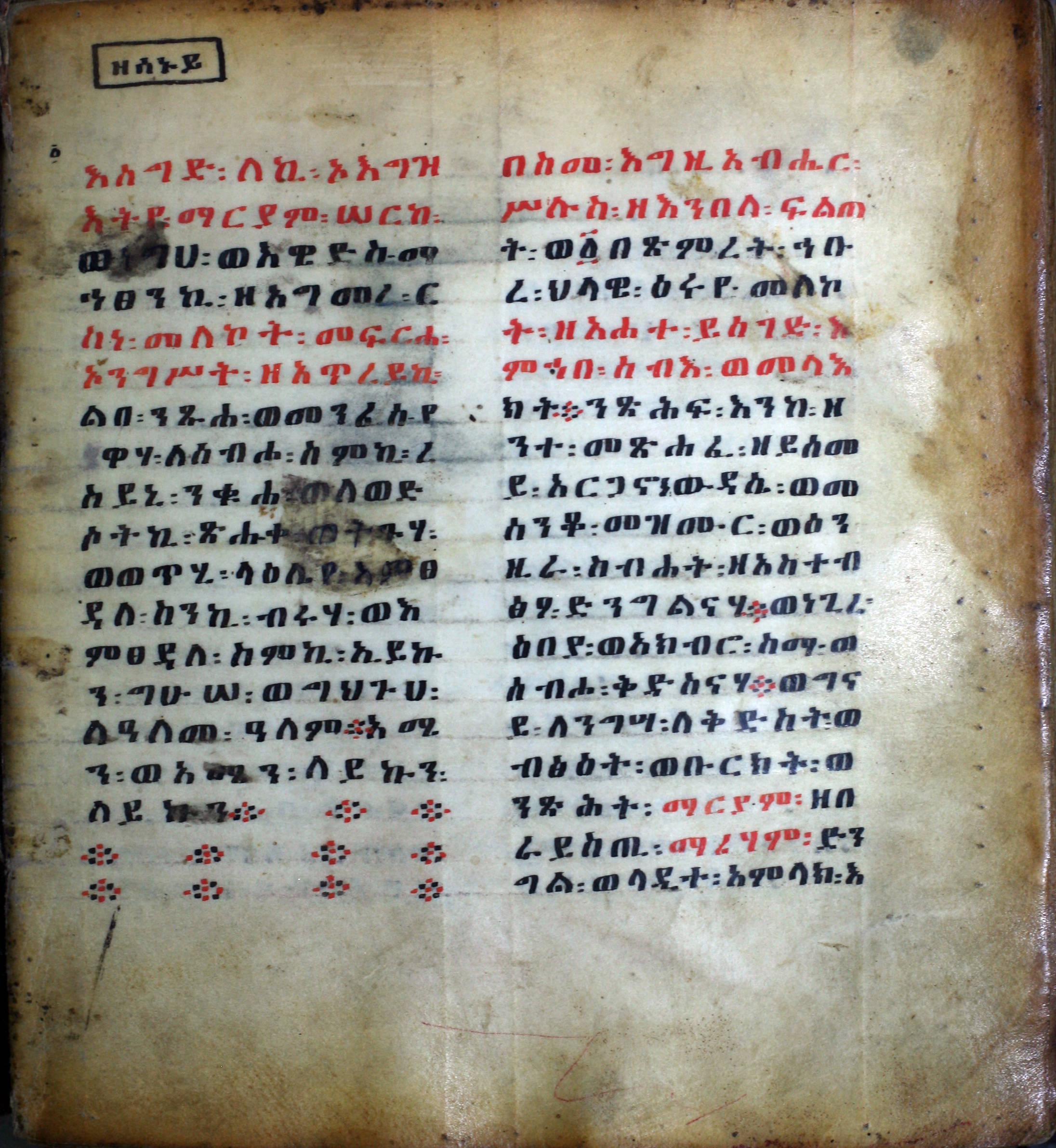
Example of Geʽez taken from a 15th-century Ethiopian Coptic prayer book

In addition to the Bible including the Deuterocanonical books, there are many medieval and early modern original texts. Most important works are also the literature of the Eritrean Orthodox Tewahedo Church and Ethiopian Orthodox Tewahedo Church, which include Christian liturgy (service books, prayers, hymns), hagiographies, and Patristic literature. For example, around 200 texts were written about indigenous Ethiopian saints from the fourteenth through the nineteenth century. Traditional education was the responsibility of priests and monks. "The Church thus constituted the custodian of the nation's culture", says Richard Pankhurst, who describes the traditional education as follows:

Traditional education was largely biblical. It began with the learning of the alphabet, or more properly, syllabary... The student's second grade comprised the memorization of the first chapter of the first Epistle General of St. John in Geez. The study of writing would probably also begin at this time, and particularly in more modern times some arithmetic might be added. In the third stage the Acts of the Apostles were studied, while certain prayers were also learnt, and writing and arithmetic continued. ... The fourth stage began with the study of the Psalms of David and was considered an important landmark in a child's education, being celebrated by the parents with a feast to which the teacher, father confessor, relatives and neighbours were invited. A boy who had reached this stage would moreover usually be able to write, and might act as a letter writer.

However, works of history and chronography, ecclesiastical and civil law, philology, medicine, and letters were also written in Geʽez.

Significant Ethiopian manuscript collections are found in France, Italy, the United Kingdom, and the United States. The collection in the British Library comprises some 800 manuscripts dating from the 15th to the 20th centuries, notably including magical and divinatory scrolls, and illuminated manuscripts of the 16th to 17th centuries. It was initiated by a donation of 74 codices by the Church of England Missionary Society in the 1830s and 1840s, and substantially expanded by 349 codices, looted by the British from the Emperor Tewodros II's capital after his suicide at Magdala during the British expedition to Abyssinia. The Metropolitan Museum of Art in New York City has at least two illuminated manuscripts in Geʽez.

=== Origins ===
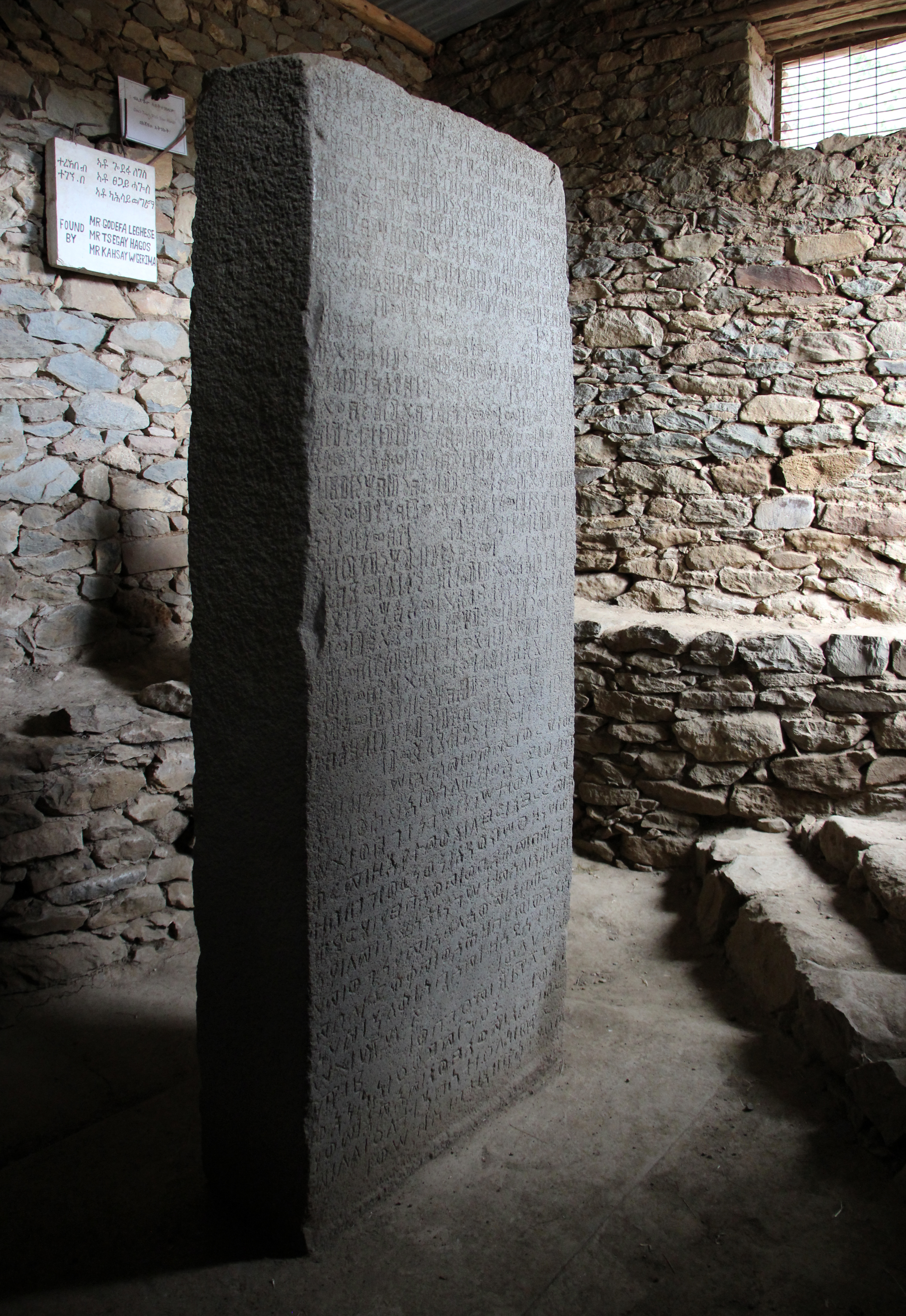
The Ezana Stone, engraved between 330 and 356, is written in early Geʽez, Sabaean and Koine Greek.

The Geʽez language is classified as a South Semitic language, though an alternative hypothesis posits that the Semitic languages of Eritrea and Ethiopia may best be considered an independent branch of Semitic, with Geʽez and the closely related Tigrinya and Tigre languages forming a northern branch while Amharic, Argobba, Harari and the Gurage languages form the southern branch.

Inscriptions dating to the mid-1st millennium BCE, written in Sabaic in the Ancient South Arabian script, have been found in the kingdom of dʿmt, serving at least as a witness to the presence of Semitic speakers in the region. There is evidence of the presence of Semitic languages in Eritrea since approximately 2000 BCE. Geʽez is not regarded as an offshoot of Sabaic or any other forms of Ancient South Arabian.

Early inscriptions in Geʽez from the Kingdom of Aksum in the epigraphic South Arabian script and in unvocalized or vocalized Ethiopic/Geʽez script have been dated to as early as the 4th century. The surviving Geʽez literature properly begins in the same century with the Christianization of Aksum, during the reign of Ezana of Aksum. The oldest known example of the Geʽez script, unvocalized and containing religiously pagan references, is found on the Hawulti obelisk in Matara, Eritrea. There exist about a dozen long inscriptions dating to the 4th and 5th centuries, and over 200 short ones.

=== 5th to 7th centuries ===
The oldest surviving Geʽez manuscript is thought to be the second of the Garima Gospels, dating to the 5th or 6th century. Almost all transmitted texts from this early Aksumite period are Christian in nature and translated from Greek. Indeed, the range and scope of the translation enterprise undertaken in the first century of the new Axumite church has few parallels in the early centuries of Christian history. The outcome was an Ethiopic Bible containing 81 books: 46 in the Old Testament and 35 in the New Testament. A number of these books are called "deuterocanonical" or "apocryphal", such as the Ascension of Isaiah, Jubilees, Book of Enoch, the 4 Baruch, Book of Noah, Ezra, Nehemiah, Maccabees, and Book of Tobit. The Book of Enoch in particular is notable since its complete text has survived in no other language; and, for the other works listed, the Ethiopic version is highly regarded as a witness to the original text.

Also to this early period dates Qerlos, a collection of Christological writings beginning with the treatise of Cyril of Alexandria (known as Hamanot Reteʼet or De Recta Fide). These works are the theological foundation of the Ethiopian Church. In the late 5th century, the Aksumite Collection—an extensive selection of liturgical, theological, synodal, and historical materials—was translated into Geʽez from Greek, providing a foundational set of instructions and laws for the developing Axumite Church. Included in this collection is a translation of the Apostolic Tradition (attributed to Hippolytus of Rome and lost in the original Greek) for which the Ethiopic version provides the best surviving witness. Another important religious document is Serʼata Paknemis, a translation of the monastic 'Rules of Pachomius'. Non-religious works translated in this period include Physiologus, a work of natural history also very popular in Europe.

The use of Geʽez is also attested in numerous excavated inscriptions. Six Geʽez inscriptions are known from 6th-century South Arabia, from during the reign of Kaleb of Axum, the king who conquered Himyar. They record his military conquests and contain many religious references, including to biblical figures such as Jesus, Mary, and David, and scriptural quotations (Isaiah 22:22–23, Psalm 65:16 and Psalm 68:2, Matthew 6:33, and with less certainty, Genesis 15:7).

=== 13th to 14th centuries ===
After the decline of the Aksumites, a lengthy gap follows; Some writers consider the period beginning from the 14th century an actual "Golden Age" of Geʽez literature—although by this time Geʽez was no longer a living language; in particular in the major enterprise of translating an extensive library of Coptic Arabic religious works into Geʽez.

While there is ample evidence that it had been replaced by Amharic in the south and by Tigrinya and Tigre in the north, Geʽez remained in use as the official written language until the 19th century, its status comparable to that of Medieval Latin in Europe.

At this time a lot of works of the Beta Israel had been turned into Hebraized (i.e. written in the Hebrew alphabet) Geʽez, which made the gradual process of Geʽez being the liturgical language of the Beta Israel.

The Ethiopic Alexander Romance was produced in this period, the most important Geʽez-language Alexander legend, translated from an earlier Arabic recension of the Alexander Romance work. Important hagiographies from this period include:

- the Gadle Samaʼetat "Acts of the Martyrs"
- the Gadle Hawaryat "Acts of the Apostles"
- the Senkessar or Synaxarium, translated as "The Book of the Saints of the Ethiopian Church"
- Other Lives of Saint Anthony, Saint George, Saint Tekle Haymanot, Saint Gabra Manfas Qeddus

Also at this time the Apostolic Constitutions was retranslated into Geʽez from Arabic. Another translation from this period is Zena ʼAyhud, a translation (probably from an Arabic translation) of Joseph ben Gurion's "History of the Jews" ("Sefer Josippon") written in Hebrew in the 10th century, which covers the period from the Captivity to the capture of Jerusalem by Titus. Apart from theological works, the earliest contemporary Royal Chronicles of Ethiopia are date to the reign of Amda Seyon I (1314–44). With the appearance of the "Victory Songs" of Amda Seyon, this period also marks the beginning of Amharic literature. The 14th century Kebra Nagast or "Glory of the Kings" by the Neburaʼed Yeshaq of Aksum is among the most significant works of Ethiopian literature, combining history, allegory and symbolism in a retelling of the story of the Queen of Sheba (i.e., Saba), King Solomon, and their son Menelik I of Ethiopia. Another work that began to take shape in this period is the Mashafa Aksum or "Book of Axum".

=== 15th to 16th centuries ===
The early 15th century Fekkare Iyasus "The Explication of Jesus" contains a prophecy of a king called Tewodros, who rose to importance in 19th century Ethiopia as Tewodros II chose this throne name.

Literature flourished especially during the reign of Emperor Zara Yaqob. Written by the Emperor himself were Matsʼhafe Berhan ("The Book of Light") and Matsʼhafe Milad 'The Book of the Nativity'. Numerous homilies were written in this period, notably Retuʼa Haimanot ("True Orthodoxy") ascribed to John Chrysostom. Also of monumental importance was the appearance of the Geʽez translation of the Fetha Negest ("Laws of the Kings"), thought to have been around 1450, and ascribed to one Petros Abda Sayd — that was later to function as the supreme Law for Ethiopia, until it was replaced by a modern Constitution in 1931.

By the beginning of the 16th century, Muslim invasions ended the flourishing of Ethiopian literature. A letter of Enbaqom (or 'Habakkuk') to Ahmad ibn Ibrahim al-Ghazi, entitled Anqasa Amin ("Gate of the Faith"), giving his reasons for abandoning Islam, although probably first written in Arabic and later rewritten in an expanded Geʽez version around 1532, is considered one of the classics of later Geʽez literature. During this period, Ethiopian writers began to address differences between the Ethiopian and the Catholic Church in such works as the Confession of Emperor Gelawdewos, Sawana Nafs ("Refuge of the Soul"), Fekkare Malakot ("Exposition of the Godhead") and Haymanote Abaw ("Faith of the Fathers"). Around 1600, several works were translated from Arabic into Geʽez for the first time, including the Chronicle of John of Nikiu and the Universal History of Jirjis al-Makin Ibn al-'Amid.

=== Current usage in Eritrea, Ethiopia and Israel ===
Geʽez is the liturgical language of Ethiopian Orthodox Tewahedo, Eritrean Orthodox Tewahedo, Ethiopian Catholic and Eritrean Catholic Christians and the Beta Israel, and is used in prayer and in scheduled public celebrations.

The liturgical rite used by the Christian churches is referred to as the Ethiopic Rite or the Geʽez Rite.

== Sample ==
The first sentence of the Book of Enoch:

ቃለ ፡ በረከት ፡ ዘሄኖክ ፡ ዘከመ ፡ ባረከ ፡ ኅሩያነ ፡ ወጻድቃነ ፡ እለ ፡ ሀለዉ ፡ ይኩኑ ፡ በዕለተ ፡ ምንዳቤ ፡ ለአሰስሎ ፡ ኵሉ ፡ እኩያን ፡ ወረሲዓን ።
Qāla {} barakat {} za-Henok {} zakama {} bāraka {} ḫəruyāna {} waṣādəqāna {} ʾəlla {} hallawu {} yəkunu {} baʿəlata {} məndābe {} laʾasassəlo {} kʷəllu {} ʾəkuyān {} warasiʿān {}
"Word of blessing of Henok, wherewith he blessed the chosen and righteous who would be alive in the day of tribulation for the removal of all wrongdoers and backsliders."

(፡ is a word divider.)

== See also ==
- Ethiopian chant
- Languages of Eritrea
- Languages of Ethiopia

== Bibliography ==
=== External history ===
- Budge, E. A. Wallis (1928). A History of Ethiopia: Nubia and Abyssinia. Oosterhour, the Netherlands: Anthropological Publications. doi:10.4324/9781315762722. ISBN 978-1-315-76272-2. (republished 1970)
- Chain, M. (1909). "Ethiopia". The Catholic Encyclopedia. Vol. V. New York: Robert Appleton Company. Archived from the original on 2007-02-06.
- Stuart, Munro-Hay (1991). Aksum: An African Civilization of Late Antiquity (PDF). Edinburgh: University Press. ISBN 978-0-7486-0106-6.
- Pankhurst, Richard K. P. (1968). An Economic History of Ethiopia, 1800–1935. Addis Ababa: Haile Selassie I University Press.
- Pankhurst, Richard K. P. (2003-11-14). "Abba 'Enbaqom, Imam Ahmad Ibn Ibrahim, and the "Conquest of Abyssinia"". Addis Tribune. Archived from the original on 2007-12-09.
- Perruchon, J. D.; Gottheil, Richard (1901–1906). "Falashas". The Jewish Encyclopedia. Archived from the original on 2018-08-14.

=== Phonology and grammar ===
- Chaîne, Marius, Grammaire éthiopienne. Beyrouth (Beirut): Imprimerie catholique 1907, 1938 (Nouvelle édition). (electronic version at the Internet Archive)
- Cohen, Marcel (1921). "la prononciation traditionnelle du Guèze (éthiopien classique)". Journal Asiatique. 11 (18). (electronic version on the Gallica digital library of the Bibliothèque nationale de France, PDF)
- Dillmann, August (1899). Grammatik der äthiopischen Sprache (2nd ed.). Leipzig: B. Tauchnitz.
- Dillmann, August; Bezold, Carl, Ethiopic Grammar, 2nd edition translated from German by James Crichton, London 1907. ISBN 978-1-59244-145-7 (2003 reprint). (Published in German: ¹1857, ²1899). (Online version at the Internet Archive)
- Gragg, Gene (1997a). "Ge'ez Phonology". In Kaye, Alan (ed.). Phonologies of Asia and Africa. Vol. 1. Winona Lake, Indiana: Eisenbrauns. pp. 169–186. ISBN 1-57506-017-5.
- Gragg, Gene (1997b). "Ge'ez (Ethiopic)". In Hetzron, Robert (ed.). The Semitic Languages. London & New York: Routledge. pp. 242–260. ISBN 0-415-05767-1.
- Gragg, Gene (2008). "Ge'ez". In Woodard, Roger (ed.). The Cambridge Encyclopedia of the World's Ancient Languages. Cambridge, New York, Melbourne, Madrid, Cape Town, Singapore, São Paulo: Cambridge University Press. ISBN 978-0-521-56256-0.
- Kidanä Wäld Kəfle, Maṣḥafa sawāsəw wagəss wamazgaba ḳālāt ḥaddis ("A new grammar and dictionary"), Dire Dawa: Artistik Matämiya Bet 1955/6 (E.C. 1948).
- Lambdin, Thomas (1978). Introduction to Classical Ethiopic. Harvard Semitic Studies. Vol. 24. Missoula: Scholars Press. ISBN 978-0-89130-263-6.
- Mercer, Samuel Alfred Browne, "Ethiopic grammar: with chrestomathy and glossary" 1920 (Online version at the Internet Archive)
- Mittwoch, Eugen (1926). Die traditionelle Aussprache des äthiopischen. Abessinische Studien. Vol. 1. Berlin & Leipzig: Walter de Gruyter & Co.
- Praetorius, Franz, Äthiopische Grammatik, Karlsruhe: Reuther 1886.
- Prochazka, Stephan, Altäthiopische Studiengrammatik, Orbis Biblicus Et Orientalis – Subsidia Linguistica (OBO SL) 2, Göttingen: Vandenhoeck & Ruprecht Verlag 2005. ISBN 978-3-525-26409-6.
- Tropper, Josef, Altäthiopisch: Grammatik der Geʽez mit Übungstexten und Glossar, Elementa Linguarum Orientis (ELO) 2, Münster: Ugarit-Verlag 2002. ISBN 978-3-934628-29-8
- Tropper, Josef (2021). Classical Ethiopic: A Grammar of Gǝˁǝz. Translated by Hasselbach-Andee, Rebecca. University Park: The Pennsylvania State University Press. ISBN 978-1-57506-841-1.
- Weninger, Stefan, Geʽez grammar, Munich: LINCOM Europa, ISBN 978-3-929075-04-5 (1st edition, 1993), ISBN 978-3-89586-604-3 (2nd revised edition, 1999).
- Weninger, Stefan, Das Verbalsystem des Altäthiopischen: Eine Untersuchung seiner Verwendung und Funktion unter Berücksichtigung des Interferenzproblems, Wiesbaden: Harrassowitz 2001. ISBN 978-3-447-04484-4.
- Zerezghi Haile, Learn Basic Geez Grammar (2015) for Tigrinya readers available at: https://uwontario.academia.edu/WedGdmhra

=== Literature ===
- Adera, Taddesse, Ali Jimale Ahmed (eds.), Silence Is Not Golden: A Critical Anthology of Ethiopian Literature, Red Sea Press (1995), ISBN 978-0-932415-47-9.
- Bonk, Jon, Annotated and Classified Bibliography of English Literature Pertaining to the Ethiopian Orthodox Church, Atla Bibliography Series, Scarecrow Pr (1984), ISBN 978-0-8108-1710-4.
- Charles, Robert Henry, The Ethiopic version of the book of Enoch. Oxford 1906. (Online version at the Internet Archive)
- Dillmann, August, Chrestomathia Aethiopica. Leipzig 1866. (Online version at the Internet Archive)
- Dillmann, August, Octateuchus Aethiopicus. Leipzig 1853. (The first eight books of the Bible in Geʽez. Online version)
- Dillmann, August, Anthologia Aethiopica, Herausgegeben und mit einem Nachwort versehen von Ernst Hammerschmidt. Hildesheim: Olms Verlag 1988, ISBN 978-3-487-07943-1 .
- The Royal Chronicles of Zara Yaqob and Baeda Maryam – French translation and edition of the Geʽez text Paris 1893 (electronic version in Gallica digital library of the Bibliothèque nationale de France)
- Ethiopic recension of the Chronicle of John of Nikiû – Paris 1883 (electronic version) in Gallica

=== Dictionaries ===
- Dillmann, August, Lexicon linguæ Æthiopicæ cum indice Latino, Lipsiae 1865. (Online version at the Internet Archive; digitized and searchable at the Beta Maṣāḥəft project)
- Leslau, Wolf (1987). Comparative Dictionary of Ge'ez (Classical Ethiopic): Geez—English, English—Geez, with an Index of the Semitic Roots. Wiesbaden: Harrassowitz. ISBN 978-3-447-02592-8.
- Leslau, Wolf (1989). Concise Dictionary of Ge'ez (Classical Ethiopic). Wiesbaden: Harrassowitz. ISBN 978-3-447-02873-8.
