= Cyricus and Julitta =

Mother and son Christian martyrs in the 4th-century AD

Saints Cyricus and Julitta
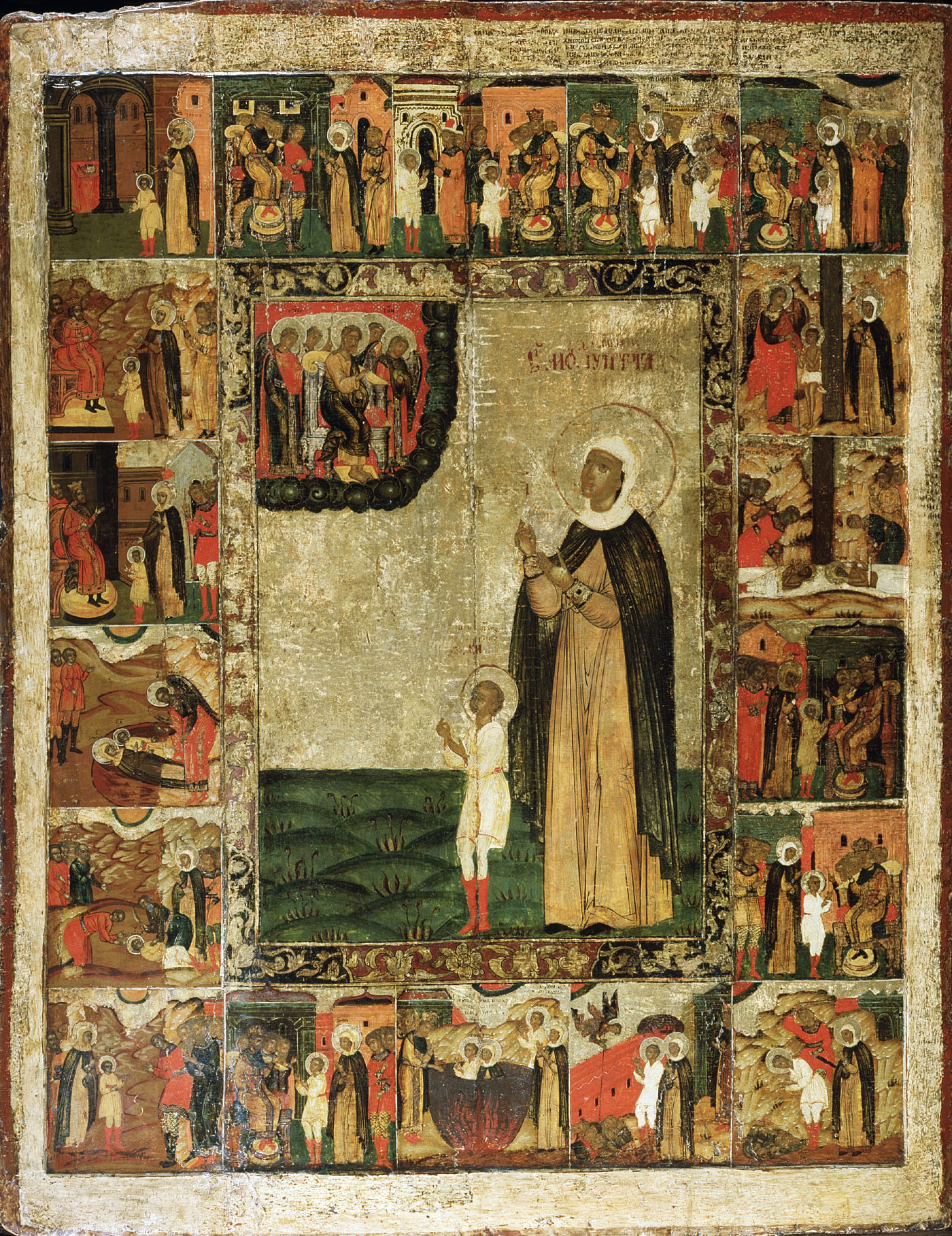
- Born: Iconium, Asia Minor (modern-day Konya, Turkey)
- Died: ~304 AD; Tarsus, Asia Minor (modern-day Tarsus, Mersin, Turkey)
- Venerated in: Church of the East; Catholic Church; Oriental Orthodox Churches; Eastern Orthodox Church
- Major shrine: Relics at Nevers, and in the monastery of Saint-Amand, Tournai.
- Feast: 16 June (Catholic Church); 15 July (Assyrian Church of the East, Eastern Orthodox Church, Oriental Orthodox Churches)
- Attributes: From the story involving Charlemagne, Cyricus is depicted as a naked child riding on a wild boar.
- Patronage: Prayed to for family happiness, and the restoring to health of sick children.

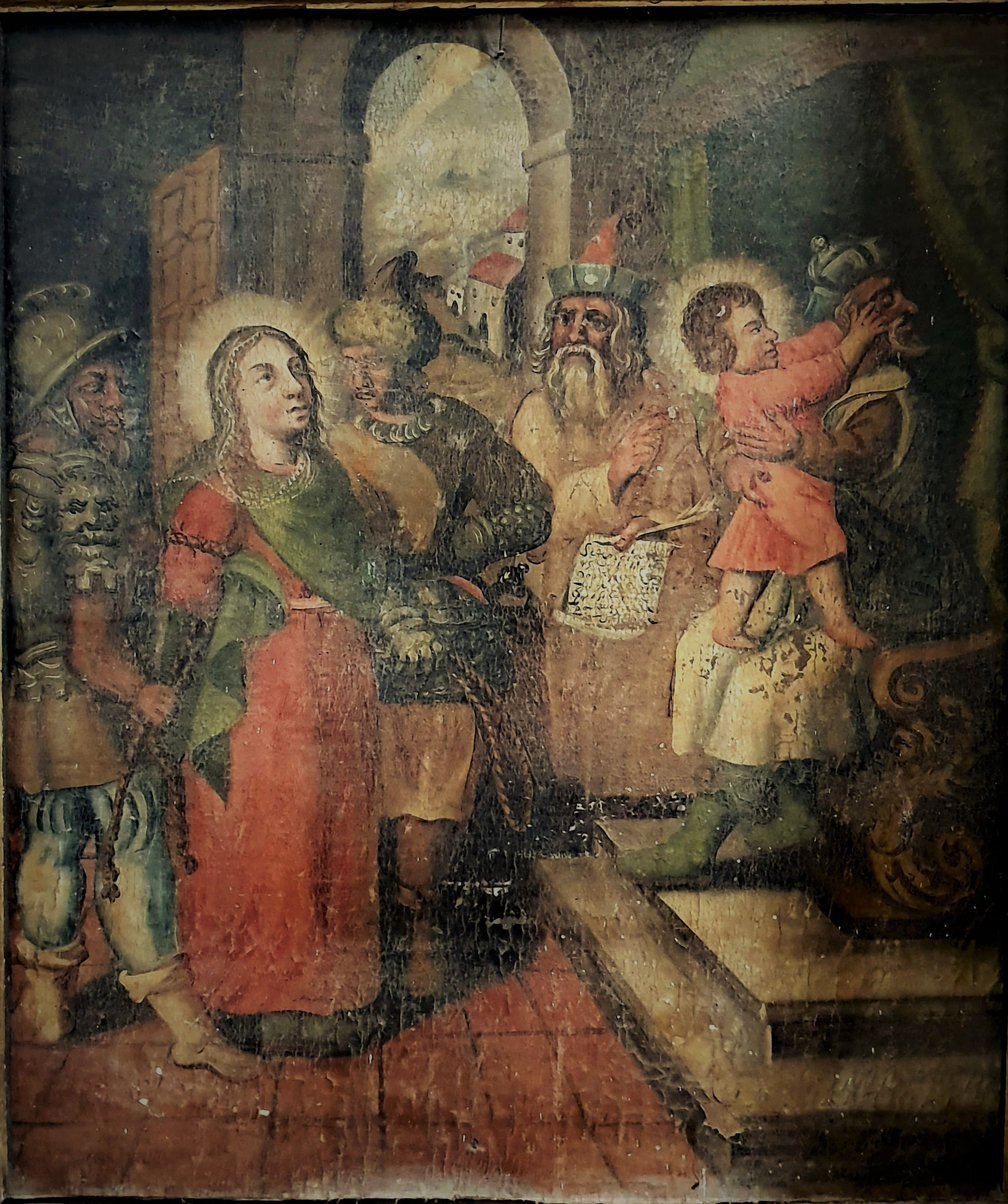
Cyricus and Julitta at Villamelendro (Palencia, Spain) Church of La Asunción.

Cyricus (Note: Also Cyriacus, Quiriac, Quiricus or Cyr; Ancient Greek: Κήρυκος, romanized: Kḗrykos; Amharic: ቂርቆስ, romanized: Qirqos; Imperial Aramaic: ܩܘܪܝܩܘܣ, romanized: Quryāqōs.) and his mother Julitta (Note: Also Julietta; Ancient Greek: Ἰουλίττα, romanized: Ioulítta; Amharic: እየሉጣ, romanized: ʾƏyäluṭa, or ኢየሉጣ, ʾIyäluṭa; Imperial Aramaic: ܝܘܠܝܛܐ, romanized: Yūlīṭā.) are venerated as early Christian martyrs. According to traditional stories, they were put to death at Tarsus in AD 304.

== Cyricus ==
Some evidence exists for an otherwise unknown child-martyr named Cyricus at Antioch. It is believed that the legends about Cyricus and Julitta refer to him. There are places named after Cyricus in Europe and the Middle East, but without the name Julitta attached. Cyricus is the Saint-Cyr found in many French toponyms, as well as in several named San Quirico in Italy. The cult of these saints was strong in France after Amator, Bishop of Auxerre, brought relics back from Antioch in the 4th century. It is said that Constantine I discovered their relics originally and built a monastery near Constantinople, and a church not far off from Jerusalem. In the 6th century, the Acts of Cyricus and Julitta were rejected in a list of apocryphal documents by the Decretum Gelasianum, called as such since the list was erroneously attributed to Pope Gelasius I.

== History ==
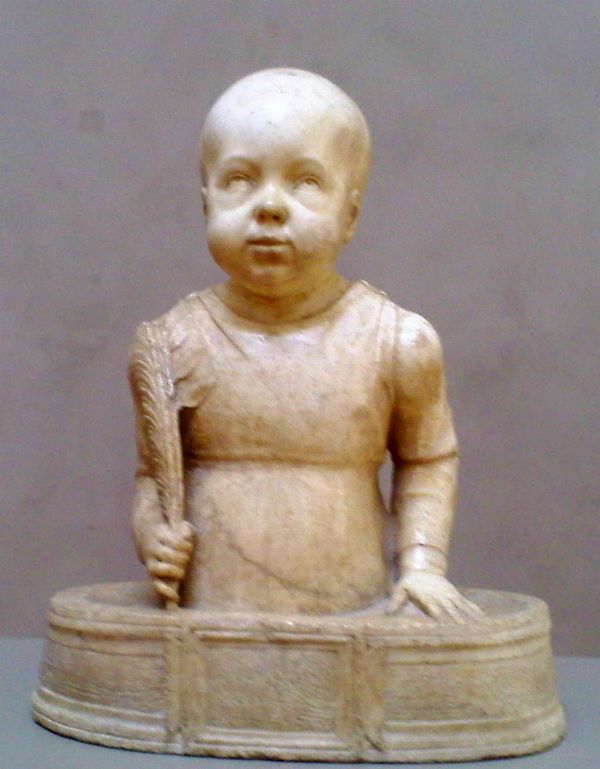
Francesco Laurana, "St. Cyricus," Getty Center, Los Angeles

According to one version of their martyrdom, Julitta and her three-year-old son Cyricus had fled to Tarsus and were identified as Christians. Julitta was tortured and Cyricus, being held by the governor of Tarsus, scratched the governor's face and was killed by being thrown down some stairs. Julitta did not weep but celebrated the fact that her son had earned the crown of martyrdom. In anger, the governor then decreed that Julitta's sides should be ripped apart with hooks, and then she was beheaded. Her body, along with that of Cyricus, was flung outside the city, on the heap of bodies belonging to criminals, but two maids rescued the corpses of the mother and child and buried them in a nearby field. This version is recorded in a letter from Theodore of Mopsuestia to Pope Zosimus and in the Acta Graece Sincera.

An alternative version of the story is found in Latin, Syriac, and Arabic. In this version, Julitta is captured without Cyricus and brought before the governor. She refuses to sacrifice to idols and tells him to find a child, so that they can ask him if he thinks it is right to worship one god or many. Cyricus is found, and he declares himself to be a Christian. The governor inflicts many tortures on them, all of which they miraculously survive. Satan enters Julitta's heart, causing her to be afraid of death, but Cyricus emboldens her with encouragement and prayers. The mother and child are finally decapitated.

== Cyricus and Charlemagne ==
A story from Nevers states that one night Charlemagne dreamed he was saved from being killed by a wild boar during a hunt. He was saved by the appearance of a nude child, who had promised to save the Emperor from death if he would give him clothes to cover his nakedness.

The bishop of Nevers interpreted this dream to mean that he wanted the Emperor to repair the roof of the Cathédrale Saint-Cyr-et-Sainte-Julitte de Nevers.

== Veneration ==
=== British Isles ===
The cult of "St. Giric" was formerly much more widespread in Celtic Britain, however. His feast day was one of the principal Welsh holidays, as codified by the laws of Hywel Dda.

There are a few churches in England dedicated to Saints Cyricus and Julitta, including Newton St. Cyres in Devon, Tickenham in Somerset, Swaffham Prior in Cambridgeshire and St Cyr’s in the town of Stonehouse in Gloucestershire- of which the grandfather of the notorious pirate “Blackbeard” was the vicar.

In Cornwall, they can be found in the villages of Luxulyan and St Veep, and there was also once a chapel at Calstock dedicated to these two saints. In Wales, there is at least one church dedicated to the saints, in Llanilid, but named as St. Ilid and St. Curig.

=== Croatia ===
In Croatia, in the Town of Višnjan, there is an 18th-century loggia and the church of Saint Cyricus (Kirik) and Julitta (Julita) dating from the 19th century.

=== Ethiopia and Eritrea ===
Cyricus or Qirqos (ቂርቆስ), also known as Qurqos or Č̣ǝrqos/Č̣ärqos, is a popular saint in Ethiopia and Eritrea, along with Julitta (ኢየሉጣ, ʾIyäluṭa). His feast is celebrated on the 15th of the month of Ṭərr (ጥር). Many churches in Ethiopia and Eritrea are named after Qirqos and Ethiopic texts on him include Täʾamrä Qirqos ("Miracles of Qirqos"), Mälkʾa Qirqos ("Image of Qirqos") and Sälam lä-Qirqos ("Salutation to Qirqos"). His Gädlä Qirqos ("(Spiritual) Combat of Qirqos", which would be known as a passio in the Western Church) is included in many Ethiopian manuscripts digitized by the Ethio-SPaRe project, including:

- ʿAddi Qolqwal Giyorgis: 1 MS (Gädlä Sämaʿtat, 16th century)
- Koholo Yoḥannǝs: 1 MS (Gädlä Sämaʿtat, 15th century)
- Mǝdrä Ruba: 1 MS (19th century)
- Qǝddus Qirqos: 2 MSS (19th century)
- Qändaʻro Qirqos: 1 MS (20th century)
- ʿUra Qirqos: 4 MSS (14th/15th, 19th, 18th, 20th century; 1 MS Gädlä Sämaʿtat)
- Wälwalo Qirqos: 1 MS (19th century)

=== Georgia ===
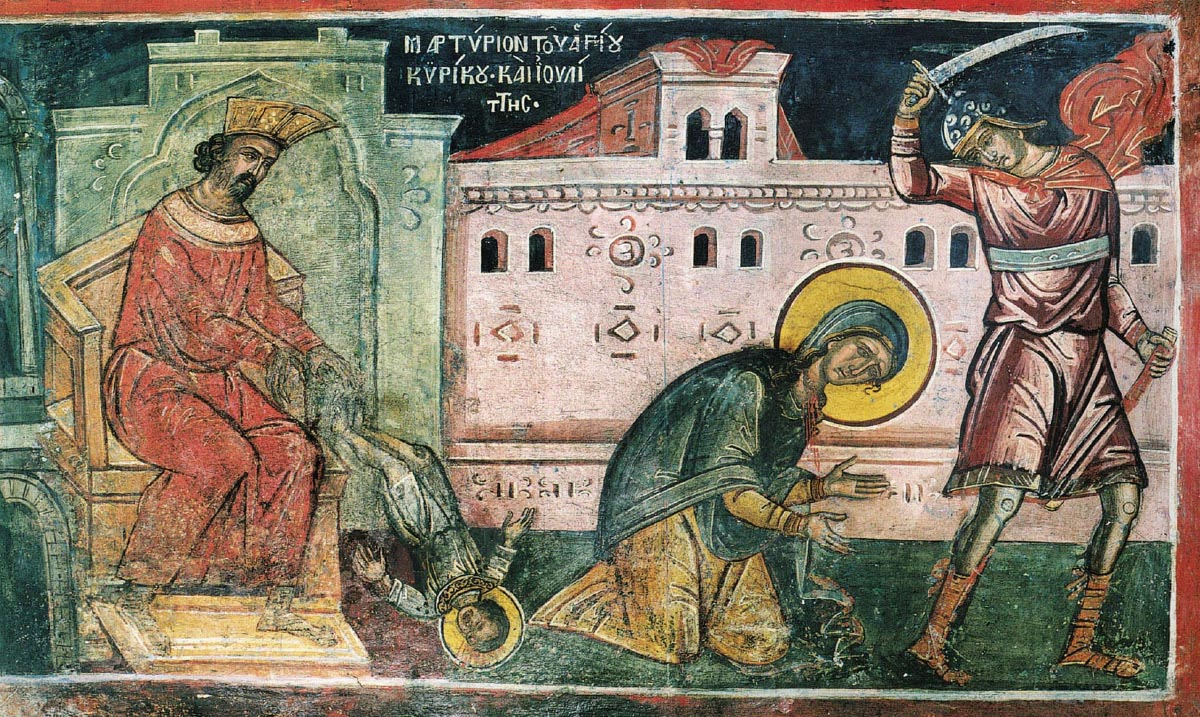
Athonite Fresco Icon of the Martyrdom of Saints Kyrikos and Ioulitte

Cyricus (Kvirike) and Julitta (Ivlita) are venerated as patron saints of the Kala community in the highland province of Svaneti. While the saints were relatively unknown in the rest of Georgia, the Svan mountaineers held them in high esteem. The 11th-century Lagurka church, located at 2200 metres above sea level and known for its wall paintings, is the scene of an all-Svan festival and pilgrimage, kvirikoba ("the day of Cyricus"), held annually on 28 July. In the words of the historian Ekvtime Taqaishvili, for the Svans Lagurka is what for the ancient Greeks was Delphi—the symbol of their unity.

=== India ===
Cyriacus is one of the saints venerated by the Saint Thomas Christians of India. Some of their important churches were dedicated to the saint. A document written in 1301 mentions the church at Kodungallur which was dedicated to the saint. The Pālūr Church, one of the seven churches associated with the mission of Thomas the Apostle, was originally dedicated to Cyriacus. There is a small piece of St. Cyricus / Kuriakose's finger at St. Peter's and St. Paul's Orthodox Church in Puthencruz (Ernakulam) They celebrate his Perunnal (feast) on July 27, 28 and the anniversary of the relocation of his bone on Nov 13, 14 of every year. Also, a piece of his other finger can be found in St. George Dayro in Malecruze in Ernakulam.

=== Italy ===
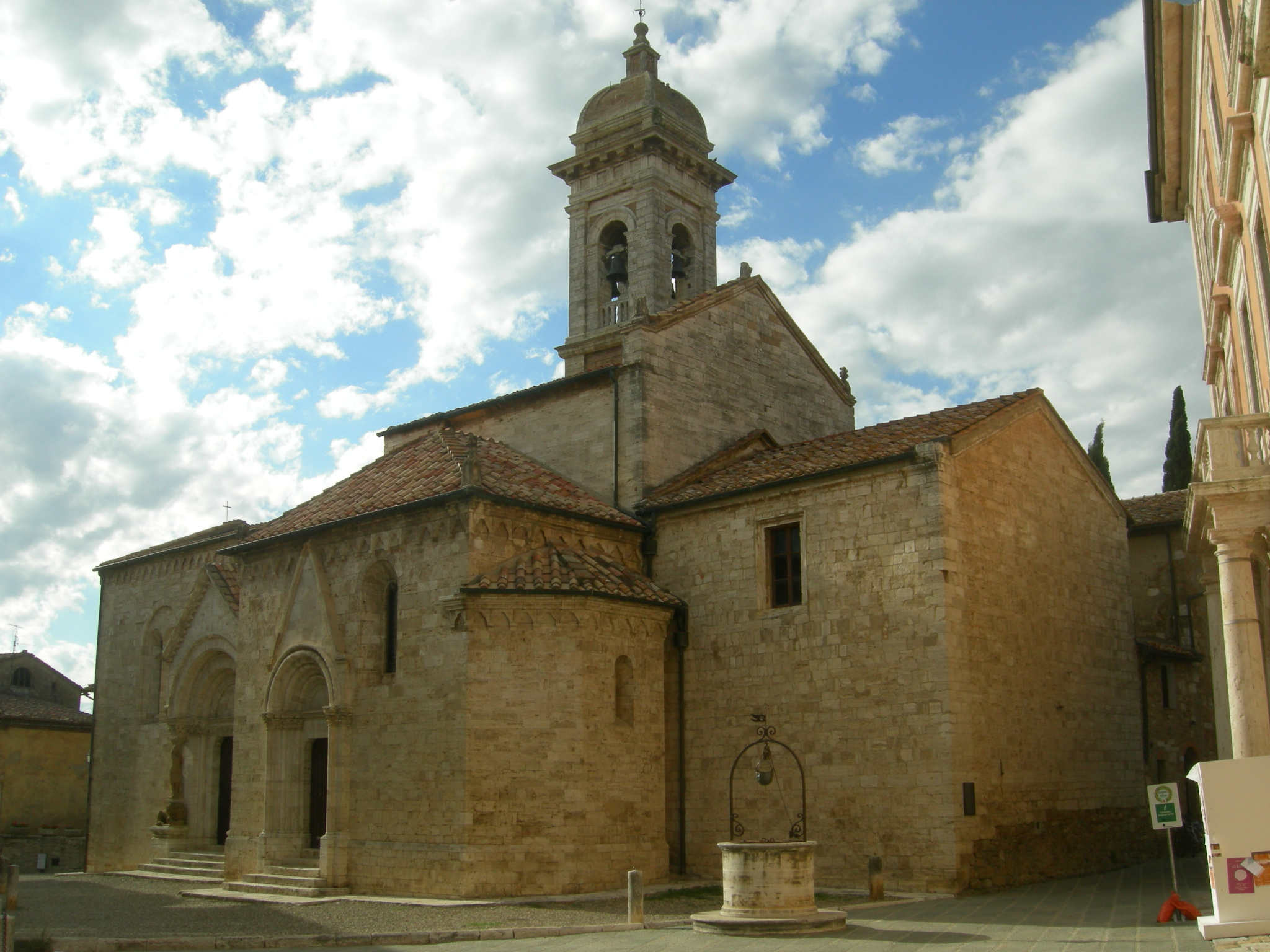
The Collegiata dei Santi Quirico e Giulitta, San Quirico d’Orcia

In Italy, where they are known as Quirico (or Quilico, or Chirico) and Giulitta (or Giuletta or Giulietta ), the place most commonly linked with the saints is the village of San Quirico d’Orcia in the Val d’Orcia of the Province of Siena, region of Tuscany. There a twelfth- or thirteenth-century church (pictured right), based on an eighth-century baptistery, is dedicated to them. The cult, however, is common in many parts of country and more than 200 churches, monasteries, localities, etc. with signs of devotion to one or both of the saints have been identified.

The Chapel of Theodotus in Santa Maria Antiqua, Rome contains a fresco cycle dedicated to Cyricus and Julitta.

Other towns and villages named after them are Corvino San Quirico (Province of Pavia), San Chirico Nuovo (Province of Potenza), San Chirico Raparo (Province of Potenza), Serra San Quirico (Province of Ancona), and Santa Giuletta (Province of Pavia). Communes of whom they are patron saints include Borgo San Martino (Province of Alessandria), Cavaria in the municipality of Cavaria con Premezzo (Province of Varese), Cisternino (Province of Brindisi), Collesalvetti (Province of Livorno), and Trofarello (Province of Turin. San Quirico, Province of Pistoia

In parts of Piedmont, including Centallo, Asti and Murisengo, an unconnected Saint Quirico is venerated, regarded as a member of the Theban Legion.

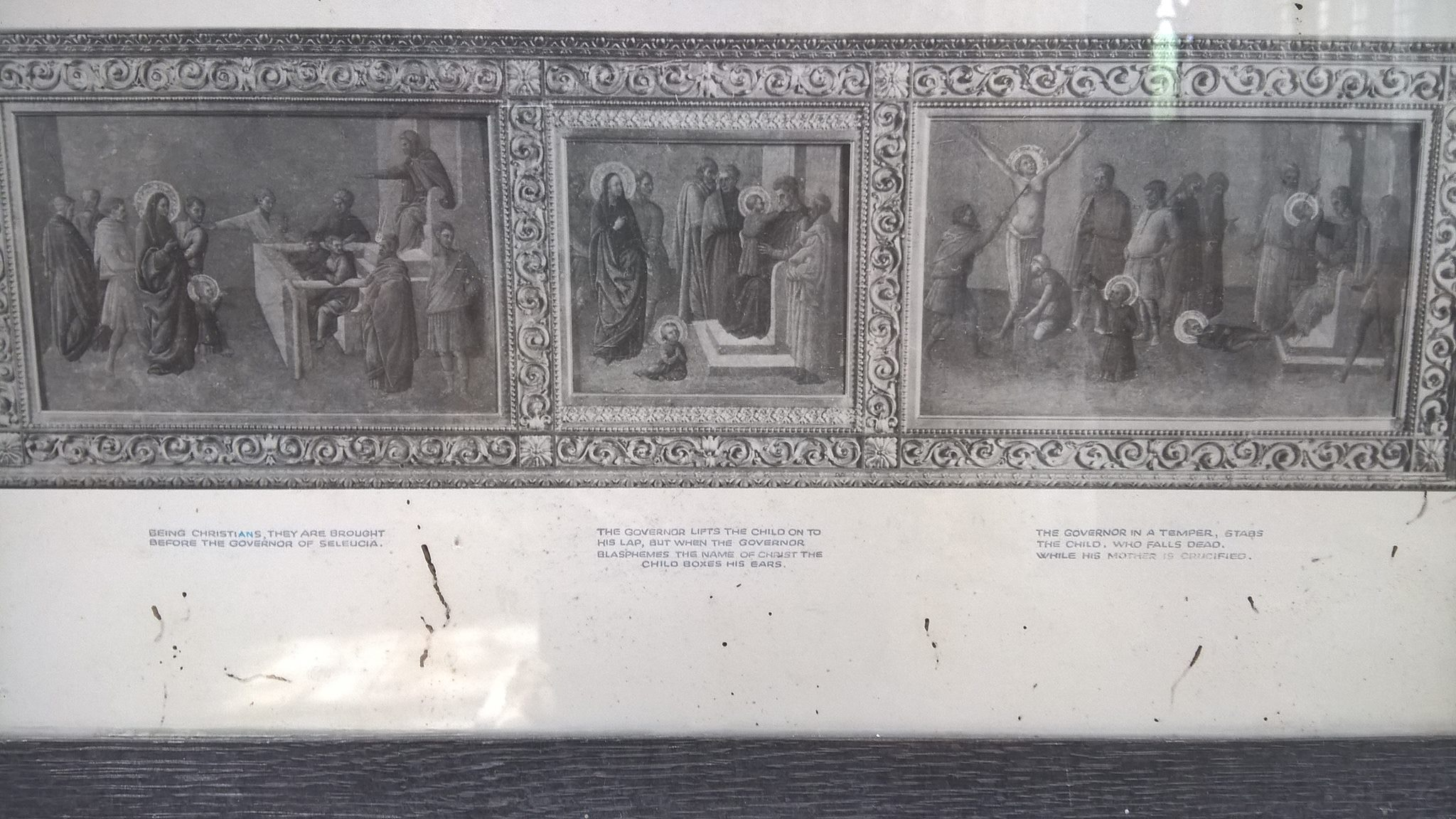
Print of St Cyricus in Lacock, Wiltshire.

St Cyriac's Church, Lacock, Wiltshire, United Kingdom has a framed print of a similar story depicting St Cyricus boxing a governor's ears because the governor had blasphemed. The embittered governor stabs the child dead, and the mother is crucified. This print appears to be based on panels from the predella of a 15th-century Italian altarpiece dedicated to Cyricus.

=== Middle East ===
Cyricus in particular is mentioned numerous times in the daily office of the Church of the East as attested in the large collection of prayers and services known as the Hudra. The mention of a saint from Tarsus in such East Syriac traditions suggests that there was considerable early sharing of martyrological traditions despite doctrinal differences between churches.
