= Gadla Sama'tat of Ura Qirqos =

15th-century Ge'ez hagiography

- Also known as: Spiritual Combat of the Martyrs
- Type: Martyrology
- Date: 15th–16th century
- Place of origin: Tigray Region, Ethiopia
- Language: Geʽez
- Scribe: 3 different scribes
- Material: Parchment
- Size: 535 × 380 × 200 mm
- Script: Geʽez
- Contents: 40 vitae of saints and martyrs

A 15th-century Geʽez manuscript containing in the hagiographical compilation known as the Gädlä Sämaʿtat (meaning "Vitae of the Martyrs") is currently held by the church of ʿUra Qirqos, near Zäla Ambässa, Tigray Region, northern Ethiopia.

== History ==
The manuscript was originally held at the monastery (gädam ገዳም) of ʿUra Mäsqäl (now located within the borders of Eritrea), but was taken to ʿUra Qirqos at the start of the Eritrean–Ethiopian War in the late 1990s. Currently, ʿUra Mäsqäl is located on a difficult-to-access rocky outcrop, surrounded by valleys littered with landmines from the war. In 2010, the manuscript was digitized by the Ethio-SPaRe project. In 2012 and 2013, Ethio-SPaRe performed restoration work on the manuscript, which was in poor condition at the time.

== Contents ==
The manuscript is a codex made of parchment. Copied by three different scribes, it is 535 × 380 × 200 mm and contains 281 folia. There are hagiographies of 40 different saints and martyrs from both within and outside Ethiopia. The sequence of hagiographies below, along with the saints' feast days according to the Ethiopian calendar, was reconstructed by Antonella Brita, since the folia were all mixed up when they were initially being researched and documented by Ethio-SPaRe.

1. Yoḥannǝs Mäṭmǝq (1 Mäskäräm)
2. Mamas, Tewodoṭos, Tewofina (5 Mäskäräm)
3. Ǝsṭifanos (15 Mäskäräm)
4. The discovery of St Ǝsṭifanos's relics (1 Ṭǝrr)
5. Ewosṭatewos (23 Mäskäräm)
6. Kirakos (5 Ṭǝqǝmt)
7. P̣änṭälewon zäṣomaʿt (6 Ṭǝqǝmt)
8. P̣änṭälewon the physician (6 Ṭǝqǝmt)
9. Qoṗryanos and Iyosṭa (7 Ṭǝqǝmt)
10. Sǝrgis and Bakkos (10 Ṭǝqǝmt)
11. Filǝyas (17 Ṭǝqǝmt)
12. Romanos (18 Ṭǝqǝmt)
13. Yoḥannǝs Däylami (19 Ṭǝqǝmt)
14. Zinobis and Zänobya (6 Ḫǝdar)
15. Ṭaṭus (17 Ḫǝdar)
16. Elewtǝros and Ǝntǝya (18 Ḫǝdar)
17. Tewoflos, P̣aṭroqya, and Dämalis (19 Ḫǝdar)
18. Qozmas and Dǝmyanos (22 Ḫǝdar)
19. Azqir (24 Ḫǝdar)
20. Märqorewos (25 Ḫǝdar)
21. Ḫirut and the martyrs of Nagran (26 Ḫǝdar)
22. Yaʿqob the Intercised (27 Ḫǝdar)
23. P̣eṭros (26 or 29 Ḫǝdar)
24. Elyas Näbiy (12 Ṭǝrr)
25. Arsima (6 Taḫśaś)
26. Bäʾamin (9 Taḫśaś)
27. Tälasǝs and Alʿazär (10 Taḫśaś)
28. Anqitos (12 Taḫśaś)
29. Märbǝhnam (14 Taḫśaś)
30. Gorgoryos (15 Taḫśaś)
31. Absadi and Alaniqos (27 Taḫśaś)
32. Martyrs of Aḫmim (29 Taḫśaś)
33. Tewodros Bänadlewos (12 Ṭǝrr)
34. Säbʿatu däqiq zäʾefeson (13 Ṭǝrr)
35. Ǝmǝrays (14 Ṭǝrr)
36. Qirqos and Yäluta (15 or 16 Ṭǝrr)
37. Äkawǝḥ (28 Ṭǝrr)
38. Orni (30 Ṭǝrr)
39. Ṭeqäla (30 Ṭǝrr)
40. Abuqir and Yoḥannǝs (6 Yäkkatit)
