= Ethiopian Renaissance =

Term espousing positive attitude for traditions and history of Ethiopia

Flag of Ethiopia

The Ethiopian Renaissance (Amharic: የኢትዮጵያ ህዳሴ) is a term similar to the African Renaissance, but more focusing on positive image of traditions and history of Ethiopia. The term also implied by the government for propaganda and political purpose such as in the controversial Grand Ethiopian Renaissance Dam project.

== Terminology ==
The Ethiopian Renaissance is analogous to the African term of "Renaissance", which strongly served as propaganda reasons. The term is a new introduction, the idea of building strong state on the grounds of traditions and history of Ethiopia. Nowadays, the term also implied to symbolical meaning of the controversial Grand Ethiopian Renaissance Dam on Blue Nile while other also seen at 2015 propaganda film material produced by the Foreign Ministry with hyping the achievements of the government.

== In the Bible ==
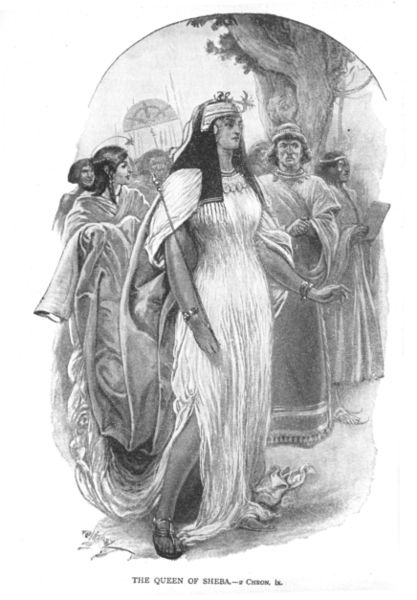
According to Solomonic dynasty chronicle, Queen Sheba was the mother of Menelik I, a supposed founder of Ethiopian monarchy in 10th century BCE.

"Princes shall come forth out of Egypt; Ethiopia shall soon stretch forth her hands unto God" is a noteworthy phrase in Psalms 68:31, also known as the Ethiopian prophecy. It influenced the African American community that originally meant they are slavery of Hebrews in Egypt, and thus become emancipated due to struggle.
