= Ethio-SPaRe =

2009–2015 research project in Ethiopia

Ethio-SPaRe (acronym for Cultural Heritage of Christian Ethiopia: Salvation, Preservation, Research) was a 2009–2015 research project hosted by the Hiob Ludolf Centre for Ethiopian Studies (HLCEES) of the University of Hamburg. The project documented various Orthodox Christian churches, monasteries, manuscripts (such as the Aksumite Collection), and cultural artefacts in the Tigray Region of northern Ethiopia. The project's principal investigator was Denis Nosnitsin. Project members also included Alessandro Bausi and others.

== Missions ==
The following missions (field research trips) were undertaken by the Ethio-SPaRe project from 2010 to 2015. Over 100 ecclesiastical sites were documented in the Tigray Region. Some of these sites were documented by Western scholars for the first time, including Däbrä Maˁṣo, Däbrä Zäyt Qǝddǝst Maryam, Qəta Maryam, Məˀəsar Gwəḥila, ˁAddi Qolqwal Giyorgis, Däbri Däbrä Zakaryas Qǝddus Giyorgis (Däbri Giyorgis), and Mǝngaś Qǝddǝst Maryam. Over 2,000 manuscripts were also recorded. Manuscripts were also catalogued in the Digital Oriental Manuscript Library (DOMLib) database.

=== 1st mission ===
The Ethio-SPaRe 1st Field Research Trip (April–May 2010) documented the following sites.

- 1. ˁUra Qirqos/ˁUra Mäsqäl
- 2. ˁAddäqäḥarsi Mäkanä Ḥǝywät Ṗaraqliṭos
- 3. Däbrä Zäyt Qǝddǝst Maryam
- 4. Däbrä Maˁṣo Qəddus Yoḥannǝs
- 5. Däbrä Gännät Qəddəst Śəllase Mədrä Ruba
- 6. Däbrä Ṣǝyon Qǝddǝst Maryam Mänäbäyti
- 7. Däbrä Berhan Qǝddǝst Maryam Foqäda
- 8. Sämaz Däbrä Mǝṭmaq Qǝddǝst Maryam gädam
- 9. Däbrä Gännät Qǝddǝst Maryam Säbäya
- 10. Däbrä Sälam Qǝddus Mikaˀel Qärsäbär
- 11. Däbrä Mänkǝrat Qǝddus Qirqos ˁAddigrat
- 12. Däbrä Mädhanit Mädḫane ˁAläm ˁAddigrat

=== 2nd mission ===
The Ethio-SPaRe 2nd Field Research Trip (November–December 2010) documented the following sites.

- 1. ˀAgamyo Qǝddus Mikaˀel
- 2. Däbrä Qǝddusan ˀAbunä Mamas ˀAgärhǝse gädam
- 3. ˀAraˁro Täklä Haymanot
- 4. ˁAddi Qolqwal Giyorgis
- 5. ˁƎmbäyto Täklä Haymanot
- 6. ˀAmbasät Kidanä Mǝḥrät
- 7. Däbrä Dammo gädam
- 8. ˀAḥzära Däbrä Mǝhrät Qǝddǝst Maryam
- The area around the city of ˁAddigrat (sites 9–15)
  - 9. Däbrä Sälam Qǝddus Mikaˀel Nǝḥbi gädam
  - 10. Däbrä Gännät Qǝddǝst Maryam Gänaḥti
  - 11. Ṣǝrḥa Ṣǝyon Betä Ḥawaryat
  - 12. Däbrä Mǝḥrät Qǝddus Mikael Bäˁatti gädam
  - 13. Mädḥane ˁAläm Ḉäḥat
  - 14. Däbrä Mǝḥrät Kidanä Mǝḥrät Läqay
  - 15. Däbrä Gännät Qǝddǝst Maryam Siˁät
  - 16. Däbrä Ṣǝyon Qǝddǝst Maryam Qiˁat
  - 17. Däbrä Gännät Kidanä Mǝḥrät Mäḵodˁä gädam
  - 18. Däbrä Sälam Qǝddus Mikaˀel Märgaḥǝya
  - 19. Däbrä Bǝrhan Yoḥannǝs Mäṭmǝq Dǝbla
- The area around Nägaš (sites 20–21)
  - 20. Däbrä Täwaḥədo Məḥrät Kädiḥ Maryam
  - 21. Däbrä Gännät Qǝddus Mikaˀel Bäläsa
- 22. Dǝrba Däbrä ˀAbunä Yasay

=== 3rd mission ===
The Ethio-SPaRe 3rd Field Research Trip (April–May 2011) documented the following sites.

- 1. Däbrä Gälila/Däbrä Betel Koholo Qəddus Yoḥannəs Mäṭməq
- 2. Maryam Mäkan
- 3. ˀAndel Maryam
- 4. Soṭa Maryam
- 5. Dändära Mikaˀel
- 6. Bet Mäkaˁ Däbrä Sahəl Qəddus Mikaˀel gädam, Bet Mäkaˁ Gäbrä Mänfäs Qəddus
- 7. May ˀAbˀa Maryam
- 8. Qəddus Gäbrəˀel Ḥawaṣi, ˀAbrəqo Qəddəst Maryam
- 9. Golˁa Yoḥannəs Mäṭməq
- 10. Qəta Maryam
- 11. Ḥarennät Maryam Gäbäzäyti
- 12. Qəddəst Maryam Kudo Hawwəs ˁAddi Qiyaḥto

=== 4th mission ===
The Ethio-SPaRe 4th Field Research Trip (November–December 2011) documented the following sites.

- 1. May ˀAnbäsa Kidanä Mǝḥrät and ˀƎnda Mäḥṣun
- 2. Sǝddäyto Mikaˀel
- 3. Taḥtay Ruba Maryam
- 4. Mäkaˀǝlo Kidanä Mǝḥrät gädam
- 5. May Ṣäˁada Śǝllase, May Ṣäˁada ˁArbaˀtu ˀƎnsǝsa
- 6. Säglat Qǝddǝst Maryam, Säglat Qǝddus Mikaˀel
- 7. ˀƎnda Ḥawaryat Ṗeṭros wä-Ṗawlos
- 8. Qändaˁro Qǝddus Qirqos
- 9. Mänäwät Qǝddus Giyorgis
- 10. May Raza Täklä Haymanot Maryam
- 11. Säwnä Maryam
- 12. Wälwalo Qirqos
- 13. Qälaqǝl Ṣǝyon Maryam
- 14. Ḥangoda Mikaˀel
- 15. Ṣäbäla Maryam
- 16. Sǝnqaṭa Fǝrewäyni Maryam
- 17. Bet Mukaˁ Mikaˀel

=== 5th mission ===
The Ethio-SPaRe 5th Field Research Trip (May–June 2012) documented the following sites.

- 1. Däbrä Mädḫanit Maryam Qorrar
- 2. Kunale ˀArbaˁtu ˀƎnsəsa
- 3. Tänsəḥe Kidanä Məḥrät gädam
- 4. Tängoga Däbrä Nazret Kidanä Məḥrät
- 5. ˀAräbay Maryam
- 6. May Bäˁatti ˀArbaˁtu ˀƎnsəsa
- 7. ˀAlˁasa Mikaˀel
- 8. ˀAgulaˁ Getesemani Kidanä Məḥrät
- 9. Məˀəsar Gwəḥila Mikaˀel

=== 6th mission ===
The Ethio-SPaRe 6th Field Research Trip (November–December 2012) documented the following sites.

- 1. Qäqäma Qəddəst Maryam Däbrä Gännät gädam
- 2. Zala ʾƎnda ʾAmanuʾel gädam
- 3. Rubaḵusa Qəddus Giyorgis gädam
- 4. Mäläkusäyto Qəddəst Maryam
- 5. ʿAddimḥara Däbrä Mädḫanit ʾAbba Yoḥanni
- 6. Məngaś Qəddəst Maryam
- 7. Däbri Däbrä Zakaryas Qəddus Giyorgis
- 8. ʾAf Məhyaw Qəddəst Maryam
- 9. Baḥəra Qəddəst Maryam gädam
- 10. Qaḥen Däbrä Ṣadəqan
- 11. ʿAddi ʾArbaʾa Däbrä Səbḥat Qəddəst Maryam
- 12. Ṣaḥəlo Däbrä Ṣäḥay Qəddəst Maryam
- 13. Däräba Mädḫane ʿAläm

=== 7th mission ===
The Ethio-SPaRe Seventh Field Mission (January–February 2014) documented the following sites.

- 1. Gwaḥtärat Qirqos
- 2. ˀƎndamosa Däbrä Sälam Mäzgäbä Śəllase
- 3. Ləḥuṣa Maryam
- 4. Maˁətäb Däbrä Gännät Maryam
- 5. Mazabər Däbrä Śəllase
- 6. ˀƎmba Täkula Däbrä Gännät Mikaˀel

=== 8th mission ===
The Ethio-SPaRe Eighth Field Mission (May–June 2014) documented the following manuscripts.

- DGQ-002, "Miracles of Mary" (Däbri Däbrä Zakaryas Giyorgis)
- TGM-003, "Undoing of Charms" (ˀAmba Tähula Mikaˀel)
- RQG-012, "Praise of Mary" (Rubakusa Giyorgis)
- UM-033, Fragment of an ancient antiphonary (?) (ˁUra Mäsqäl)
- MQMA-005, "Spiritual Elder" (Məngaś Maryam)
- EMQ-008, Psalter and other texts (ˀƎnda Maryam Qorrar)
- EMQ-060, Collection of miscellaneous texts (ˀƎnda Maryam Qorrar)
- Manuscripts from ˁUra Mäsqäl
  - Octateuch UM-040
  - Four Gospels UM-027

=== 9th mission ===
The Ethio-SPaRe Ninth Field Mission (March 2015) documented the following sites.

- May Ḥargäs Giyorgis
- May Gaba Mikaˀel

=== Subsequent missions ===
After the Ethio-SPaRe project was over in 2015, the project team members documented several more sites:

- ˀƎnqwaqo ˀƎnda Maryam Däbrä Mongway
- Zǝqallay Mädḫane ˁAläm Bäräkti, Zǝqallay ˀOm Ṣällim Sǝllaśe
- May Läbay Däbrä Mäwiˀ Qǝddus Minas
- Ṣǝlalmǝˁo Däbrä Ṣäḥay Qǝddus Gäbrǝˀel
- ˀƎnda Ṣadǝqan Mǝḥräta
- ˁAba Qəddus Qirqos
- Ṭaqot Maryam ˀƎnda Ṣəyon Maryam

The Beta maṣāḥǝft project was initiated after the Ethio-SPaRe project was over in 2015, and included field research from 2018 to 2019. The project has documented bookmaking in Lǝggat Qirqos, Gulo Mäkäda district, eastern Tigray Region.

== Sites catalogued in Nosnitsin (2013) ==
Denis Nosnitsin's 2013 monograph Churches and Monasteries of Tǝgray catalogued manuscripts held at over 100 churches and monasteries in the Tigray Region of Ethiopia. Some of these churches and monasteries are as follows.

- Gulo Mäḵäda woreda
  - ʿUra Qirqos/ʿUra Mäsqäl
  - ʿAddäqäḥarsi Mäkanä Ḥǝywät P̣araqliṭos
  - Däbrä Zäyt Qǝddǝst Maryam
  - Däbrä Maʿṣo Qǝddus Yoḥannǝs
  - May Č̣äw Qǝddus Mikaʾel
  - Mǝdrä Ruba Däbrä Gännät Qǝddǝst Śǝllase
  - Mänäbäyti Däbrä Ṣǝyon Qǝddǝst Maryam
  - Fäqada Däbrä Bǝrhan Qǝddǝst Maryam
  - Sämaz Däbrä Mǝṭmaq Qǝddǝst Maryam gädam
  - Säbäya Däbrä Gännät Qǝddǝst Maryam
  - Qärsäbär Däbrä Sälam Qǝddus Mikaʾel
  - ʾAgamyo Qǝddus Mikaʾel
  - ʾAgärhǝse Däbrä Qǝddusan ʾAbunä Mamas gädam
  - ʾAraʿro Täklä Haymanot
  - ʿAddi Qolqwal Giyorgis
  - ʿƎmbäyto Täklä Haymanot
  - Mäkaʾǝlo Mäkanä Lǝʿul Kidanä Mǝḥrät gädam
  - ʾAmbasät Kidanä Mǝḥrät
  - Däbrä Dammo ʾAbunä ʾArägawi gädam
  - ʾAḥzära Däbrä Mǝhrät Qǝddǝst Maryam
  - ʿAddi Qiyaḥto Qǝddǝst Maryam Kudo Hawwǝs
  - Säglat Qǝddǝst Maryam / Qǝddus Mikaʾel
  - Sǝddäyto Däbrä Gännät Qǝddus Mikaʾel
  - Taḥtay Ruba Däbrä Bǝrhan Qǝddǝst Maryam
  - May Ṣaʿda Qǝddǝst Śǝllase
  - ʾƎnda Ḥawaryat P̣eṭros wä-P̣awlos
- ʿAddigrat woreda
  - ʿAddigrat Däbrä Mänkǝrat Qǝddus Qirqos
  - ʿAddigrat Däbrä Mädhanit Mädḫane ʿAläm
- Ganta ʾAfäšum woreda
  - Nǝḥbi Däbrä Sälam Qǝddus Mikaʾel gädam
  - Gänaḥti Däbrä Gännät Qǝddǝst Maryam
  - Betä Ḥawaryat Ṣǝrḥa Ṣǝyon gädam
  - Bäʿatti Däbrä Mǝḥrät Qǝddus Mikaʾel gädam
  - Mäḵan Maryam
  - Bet Mäḵaʿ Däbrä Sahǝl Qǝddus Mikaʾel gädam / Gäbrä Mänfäs Qǝddus
  - May ʾAbʾa Maryam
  - Č̣äḥat Mädḥane ʿAläm
  - Läq̱ay Däbrä Mǝḥrät Kidanä Mǝḥrät
  - Siʿät Däbrä Gännät Qǝddǝst Maryam
  - Qiʿat Däbrä Ṣǝyon Qǝddǝst Maryam
  - Mäḵodʿä Däbrä Gännät Kidanä Mǝḥrät gädam
  - Märgaḥǝya Däbrä Sälam Qǝddus Mikaʾel
  - Dǝbla Däbrä Bǝrhan Yoḥannǝs Mäṭmǝq
  - ʾAndel Maryam
  - Soṭa Däbrä Sälam Qǝddus Mikaʾel
  - Dändera Däbrä Mǝḥrät Qǝddus Mikaʾel
  - Ḥawaṣi Qǝddus Gäbrǝʾel and ʾAbrǝqo Qǝddǝst Maryam
  - Golʿa Yoḥannǝs Mäṭmǝq
  - Qǝta Maryam
  - Ḥarennät Maryam Gäbäzäyti
  - Qändaʿro Däbrä Ḫayl Qǝddus Qirqos
  - Mǝʾǝsar Gwǝḥila Qǝddus Mikaʾel
  - Mäläkusäyto Qǝddǝst Maryam
  - ʿAddimḥara Däbrä Mädḫanit ʾAbba Yoḥanni
  - Mǝngaś Qǝddǝst Maryam
  - Däbri Däbrä Zakaryas Qǝddus Giyorgis
  - ʾAf Mǝhyaw Qǝddǝst Maryam
  - Baḥǝra Qǝddǝst Maryam gädam
  - Gwaḥgot Däbrä Ṣǝge ʾIyäsus
- ʾƎndärta woreda
  - Dǝrba Däbrä ʾAbunä Yasay
  - Koholo Däbrä Gälila Däbrä Betel Qǝddus Yoḥannǝs Mäṭmǝq
  - May ʾAnbäsa Däbrä Gännät Kidanä Mǝḥrät gädam / ʾƎnda Mäḥṣun gädam
- Kǝlǝttä ʾAwlaʿlo woreda
  - Kädiḥ Däbrä Täwaḥǝdo Qǝddǝst Maryam
  - Bäläsa Däbrä Gännät Qǝddus Mikaʾel
  - ʾAgulaʿ Getesemani Kidanä Mǝḥrät gädam
  - Qaḥen Däbrä Ṣadǝqan
  - ʿAddi ʾArbaʾa Däbrä Sǝbḥat Qǝddǝst Maryam
  - Ṣaḥǝlo Däbrä Ṣäḥay Qǝddǝst Maryam
  - Däräba Mädḫane ʿAläm
  - Mäʿago ʾAmanuʾel
- Saʿsi Ṣaʿda ʾƎmba woreda
  - Mänäwät Giyorgis ʾƎnda Maryam
  - May Raza Täklä Haymanot
  - Säwnä Däbrä Sina Däbrä Gännät Maryam
  - Wälwalo Däbrä Bǝrhan Qirqos
  - Qälaq̱ǝl Ṣǝyon Maryam
  - Ḥangoda Däbrä Mǝḥrät Qǝddus Mikaʾel
  - Ṣäbäla Däbrä Gännät Maryam gädam
  - Sänqaṭa Fǝrewäyni Däbrä Ṣǝge Qǝddǝst Maryam
  - Bet Muḵaʿ Qǝddus Mikaʾel
- Dägʿa Tämben woreda
  - Qorrar Däbrä Mädḫanit Qǝddǝst Maryam gädam
  - Kunale ʾArbaʿtu ʾƎnsǝsa
  - Tänsǝḥe Kidanä Mǝḥrät gädam
  - Tägoga Däbrä Nazret Kidanä Mǝḥrät gädam
  - ʾAräbay Qǝddus Mikaʾel
  - May Bäʿatti Däbrä Gännät ʾArbaʿtu ʾƎnsǝsa
  - ʾAlʿasa Qǝddus Mikaʾel
  - Qäqäma Qǝddǝst Maryam Däbrä Gännät gädam
  - Zala ʾƎnda ʾAmanuʾel gädam
  - Rubaḵusa Qǝddus Giyorgis gädam

== Workshops ==
The following academic workshops were held by the Ethio-SPaRe project.

- Ecclesiastic Landscape of North Ethiopia: History, Change and Cultural Heritage (2011)
- Saints in Christian Ethiopia: Literary Sources and Veneration (2012)
- The Secondary Life of Manuscripts (2013)
- Manuscripts as Artefacts: Methods of their Study and Conservation (June 2014)
- Manuscripts and texts, languages and contexts: the transmission of knowledge in the Horn of Africa (July 2014)

== Bibliography ==
=== Books ===
The following academic volumes were published by Harrassowitz as a result of the Ethio-SPaRe project.

- Nosnitsin, Denis (2013). Churches and Monasteries of Tǝgray: A Survey of Manuscript Collections. Supplements to Aethiopica. Vol. 1. Wiesbaden: Harrassowitz. ISBN 978-3-447-06969-4.
- Nosnitsin, Denis, ed. (2013). Ecclesiastic Landscape of North Ethiopia: Proceedings of the International Workshop, Ecclesiastic Landscape of North Ethiopia: History, Change and Cultural Heritage Hamburg, July 15–16, 2011. Supplements to Aethiopica. Vol. 2. Wiesbaden: Harrassowitz. ISBN 978-3-447-10102-8.
- Nosnitsin, Denis, ed. (2015). Veneration of Saints in Christian Ethiopia: Proceedings of the International Workshop Saints in Christian Ethiopia: Literary Sources and Veneration, Hamburg, April 28–29, 2012. Supplements to Aethiopica. Vol. 3. Wiesbaden: Harrassowitz. ISBN 978-3-447-10399-2.
- Bausi, Alessandro; Gori, Alessandro; Nosnitsin, Denis; Sokolinski, Eugenia, eds. (2015). Essays in Ethiopian Manuscript Studies: Proceedings of the International Conference Manuscripts and Texts, Languages and Contexts: the Transmission of Knowledge in the Horn of Africa. Hamburg, 17–19 July 2014. Supplements to Aethiopica. Vol. 4. Wiesbaden: Harrassowitz. ISBN 978-3-447-10430-2.

=== Articles ===
- Brita, Antonella (2015). "The manuscript as a leaf puzzle: the case of the Gädlä Sämaʿtat from ʿUra Qirqos (Ethiopia)" (PDF). COMSt Bulletin. 1.
- Di Bella, Marco; Sarris, Nikolas (2014). Field Conservation in East Tigray Ethiopia. Conference: Care and conservation of manuscripts 14. Copenhagen.
- Di Bella, Marco; Sarris, Nikolas (2021). The Conservation of a fifteenth century large parchment manuscript of Gädlä sämaʿtat from the monastery of ʿUra Mäsqäl: Further conservation experiences from East Tigray, Ethiopia. Care and conservation of manuscripts 18. Copenhagen.

== See also ==
- Ethiopian manuscript collections
- Ethiopian studies
- Gadla Sama'tat of Ura Qirqos
