= Gadla Sama'tat =

Ge'ez hagiography

The Gadla Samāʿtāt (also spelled Gädlä Sämaʿtat, meaning "Spiritual Combat of the Martyrs") is an Ethiopic (Ge'ez) compilation of saints' lives, with the oldest components dating to the 13th century. Egyptian martyrs are well represented but there are other Eastern saints as well. They are ordered by day of commemoration in the Ethiopian liturgical calendar. The texts are all translations from Arabic save the life of Wasilides, which was translated from Coptic. It is an open question whether any of the lives are derived from Greek originals, but there is evidence favouring it in some cases (e.g, lack of Arabisms).

The Gadla Samāʿtāt is a body of texts that only gradually came together as a collection. The earliest attestation of a collection known as Gadla Samāʿt is found in an inventory of Istifanos Monastery from 1292 referring to books donated by Iyasus Mo'a. The translation of many individual lives, however, is attributed to Abuna Salama II (r. 1348–1388). The full collection contains at least 142 lives.

The Gadla Samāʿtāt survives in some form in at least 34 known manuscripts, but a majority of these contain only a fraction of the lives. There are 24 main manuscripts that contain only the Gadla Samāʿtāt and no other texts, ranging in completeness from two to twelve months. There are five manuscripts in which lives from the Gadla Samāʿtāt are mixed with lives from the Gadla Qeddusān ("Spiritual Combat of the Saints"), which are mostly monastic lives. There are another five manuscripts which contain just a single month of lives from the Gadla Samāʿtāt alongside unrelated material. A majority of manuscripts are from the 15th century or earlier. The Gadla Samāʿtāt was the first calendar of saints of Ethiopia before it was gradually replaced by the Ethiopian Synaxarium.

== See also ==
- Gadla Sama'tat of Ura Qirqos, a 15th-century manuscript of the Gadla Sama'tat
- Martyrdom of Azqir

== Bibliography ==
- Bausi, Alessandro (2002). La versione etiopica degli Acta Phileae nel Gadla samāʿtāt (PDF). Naples: Istituto Universitario Orientale.
- Bovon, François (2003). "The Dossier on Stephen, the First Martyr". The Harvard Theological Review. 96 (3): 279–315. JSTOR 4151873.
- Brita, Antonella (2015). "The Manuscript as a Leaf Puzzle: The Case of the Gädlä Sämaʿtat from ʿUra Qirqos (Ethiopia)" (PDF). Comparative Oriental Manuscript Studies Bulletin. 1: 6–17.
