= Theodor von Lüpke =

German architectural historian

Theodor Friedrich Heinrich von Lüpke (12 April 1873, Hermannsburg – 13 April 1961, Bückeburg) was a German architectural historian known for his work in the field of photogrammetry.

From 1894 to 1898 he studied architecture at the Technical Universities of Munich and Hannover, where he was a student of Conrad Wilhelm Hase. From 1907 to 1911 he served as a Regierungsbaumeister (government architect) in the Prussian Ministry of Geistliche, Unterrichts- und Medizinalangelegenheiten. From 1911 to 1938 he was director of the Royal Photogrammic Institute for Denkmalaufnahmen (records of monuments).

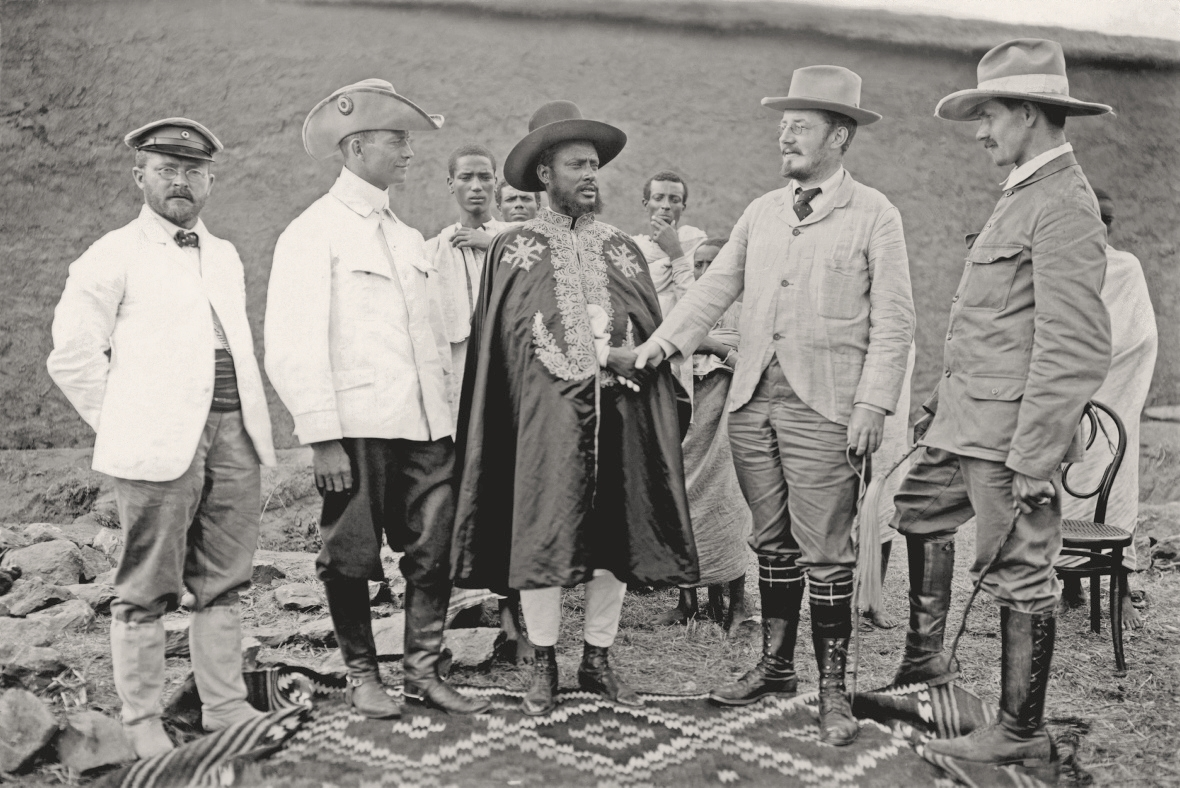
German "Aksum Expedition", February 1906. From left: Theodor von Lüpke, Dr. Erich Kaschke, Gebre Selassie (Governor of the province of Tigre), Enno Littmann and Daniel Krencker.

He provided photogrammic documentation for architectural structures in Constantinople (the Hagia Sophia, 1902 and the Theodosian walls, 1928), in Lebanon (the excavation site at Baalbek, 1902–03), in Ethiopia (monuments investigated by the German "Aksum-Expedition", 1906), in Anatolia (the ancient Roman temple at Aizanoi, 1928) and at various locations in Europe.

He was a co-founder of the Deutsche Gesellschaft für Photogrammetrie (1909) and of the Koldewey-Gesellschaft (Koldewey Society, 1926). He was a corresponding member of the Deutschen Archäologischen Institut and of the International Society for Photogrammetry.

== Published works ==
- "Profan- und kultbauten Nordabessiniens aus älterer und neuerer zeit", (1913).
- "Baalbek : Ergebnisse der Ausgrabungen und Untersuchungen in den Jahren 1898 bis 1905" (with Theodor Wiegand, Hermann Winnefeld, Bruno Schulz, Daniel Krencker, Otto Puchstein, Heinrich Kohl, Gottlieb Schumacher, et al.)
- "Das alte Nürnberg in neuen Lichtbildern Preussische Akademie d. Künste; Staatl. Bildstelle; Ausstellung zum 50jähr. Bestehen d. Staatl. Bildstelle (Messbildanst.), 1885-1935", (1935).
- "Die Landmauer von Konstantinopel/ 1, Zeichnerische Wiederherstellung mit begleit. Text v. Fritz Krischen", (1938).
- "The monuments of Aksum : an illustrated account" (by Daniel Krencker; Enno Littmann; Theodor von Lüpke; David W Phillipson), Addis Ababa Univ. Press [u.a.] 1997 (published in English).
