= Heinrich Kohl =

German architectural historian and archaeologist

Heinrich Kohl (4 May 1877, Kreuznach – 26 September 1914, Moronvilliers) was a German architectural historian and archaeologist.

He took classes in architecture at the technical universities in Munich, Dresden and Berlin. In 1902 he passed the first state examination for Regierungsbauführer, then later passed the second state examination for attaining "government architect" status (1907). Within this time frame he attended lectures on archaeology at the University of Freiburg (1904). In May 1914 he obtained his habilitation in architectural history from the Technical University of Hannover.

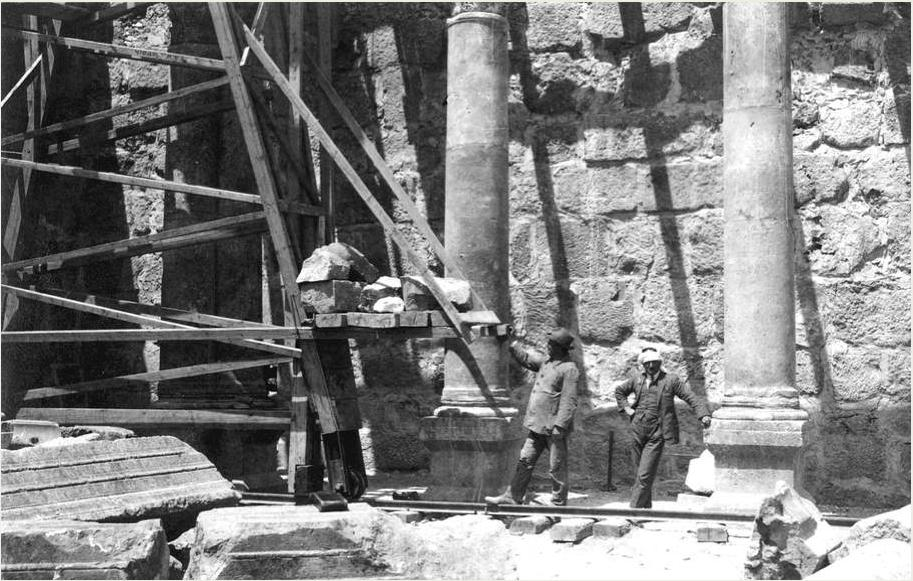
Kohl and Watzinger working at the synagogue in Capernaum (1905).

In 1902–1904, under the guidance of Otto Puchstein and Bruno Schulz, he took part in the excavation at Baalbek. In the summer of 1905, along with Carl Watzinger, he investigated the synagogue ruins in Palestine (Galilee). In the summer of 1907, with Puchstein, he performed excavatory work of the ancient Hittite capital of Hattusa (Asia Minor). In November 1907, he studied the ruins of Qasr al-Bint Firaun at Petra.

During World War I, as an Oberleutnant assigned to the Saxon Reserve Infantry Regiment (Sächsischen Reserve-Infanterieregiments), he was killed on 26 September 1914 at Moronvilliers, a French village not far from Reims.

== Selected works ==
- Kasr Firaun in Petra, 1908 – Qasr al-Bint Firaun in Petra.
- Boghasköi. Die Bauwerke, 1912 (with Otto Puchstein, Daniel Krencker) – Hattusa, its structures.
- Antike Synagogen in Galilaea, 1916 (with Carl Watzinger) – Ancient synagogues in Galilee.
- Baalbek - Ergebnisse der Ausgrabungen und Untersuchungen in den Jahren 1898 bis 1905, 1921 (with Bruno Schulz, Daniel Krencker, Otto Puchstein, Hermann Winnefeld) – Baalbek: Results of excavations and investigations in the years 1898–1905.
