= Axum =

Town in Tigray Region, Ethiopia

Axum Tigrinya: ኣኽሱም Amharic: አክሱም Ge’ez: አኵስም;
- City
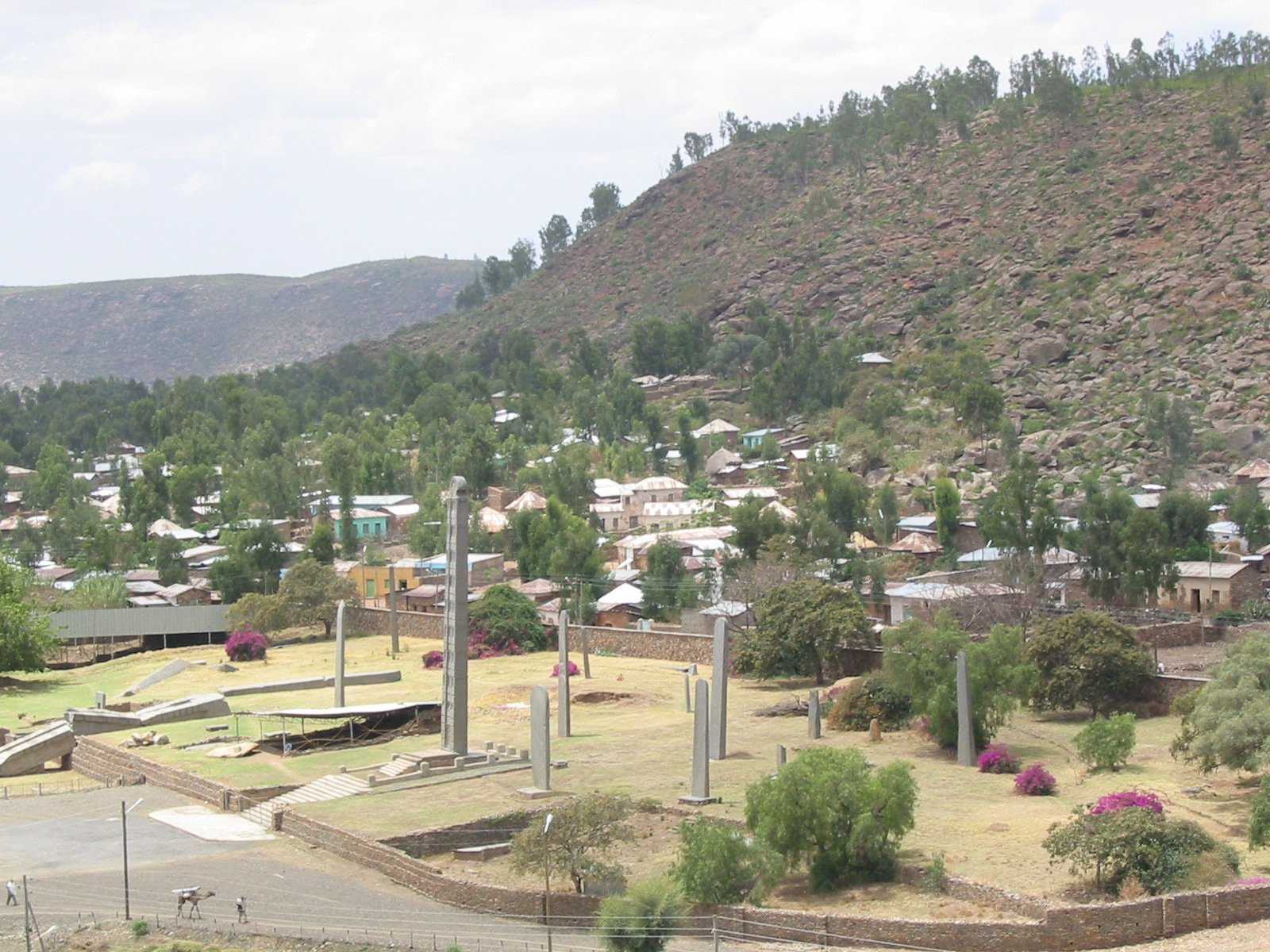
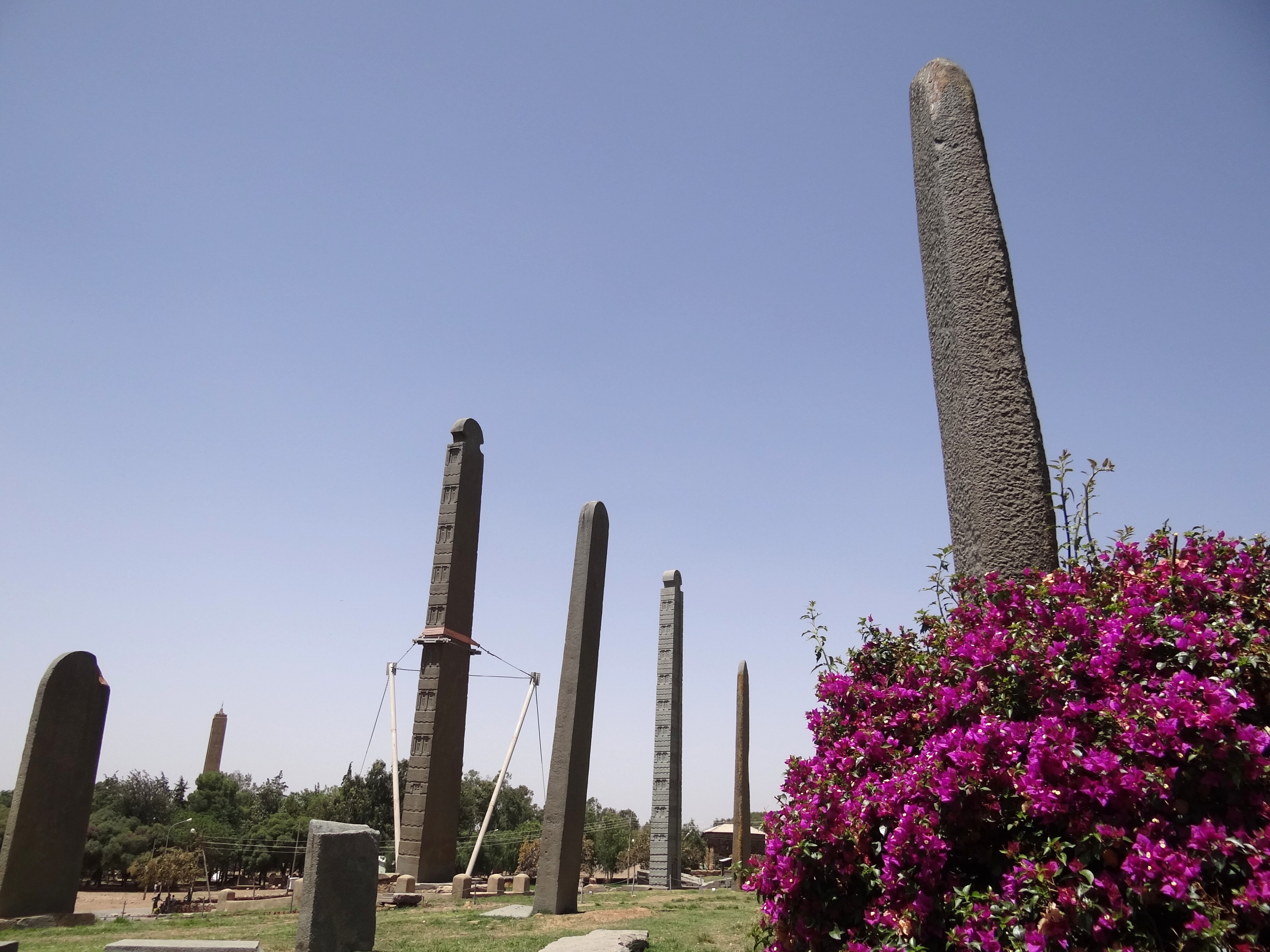
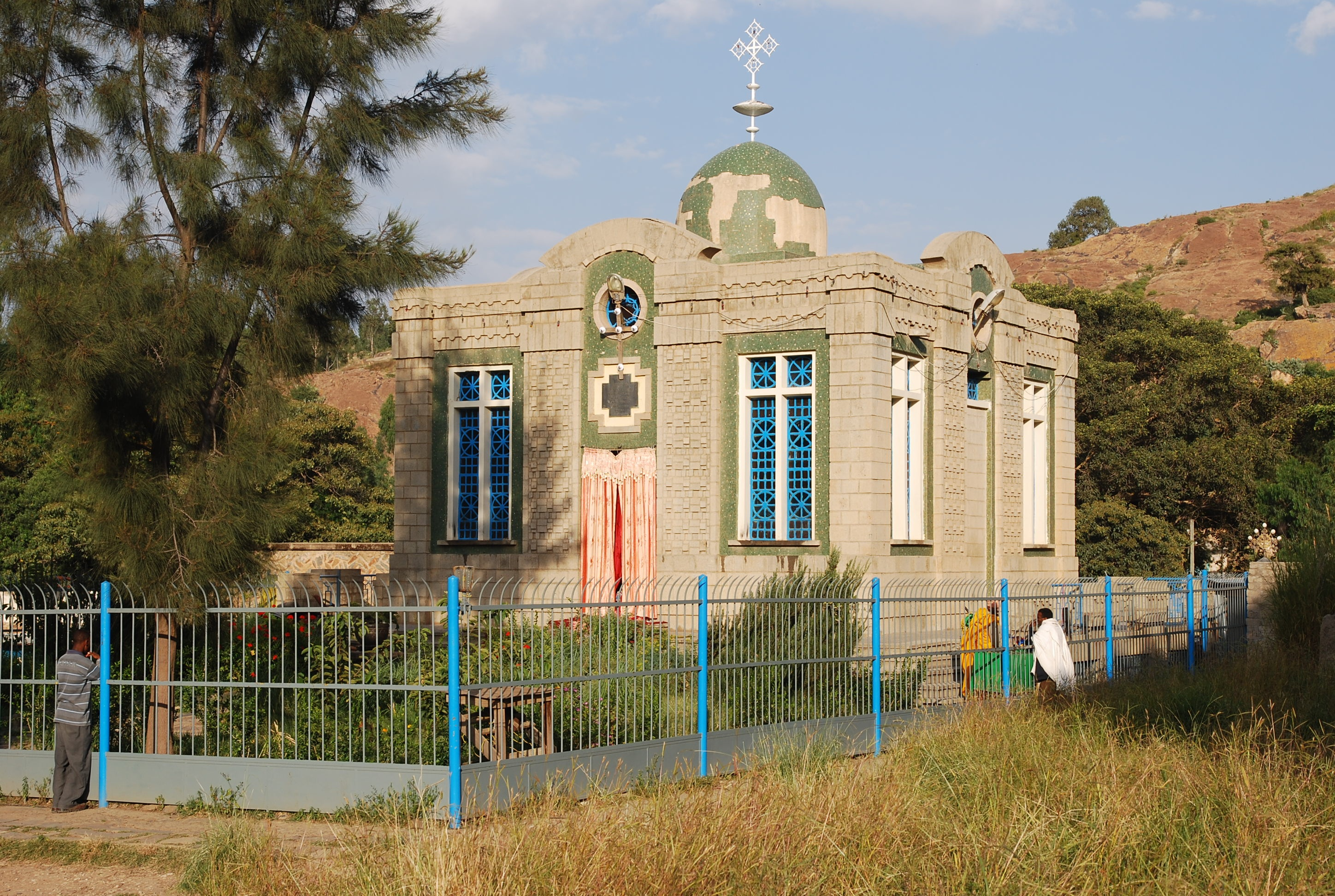
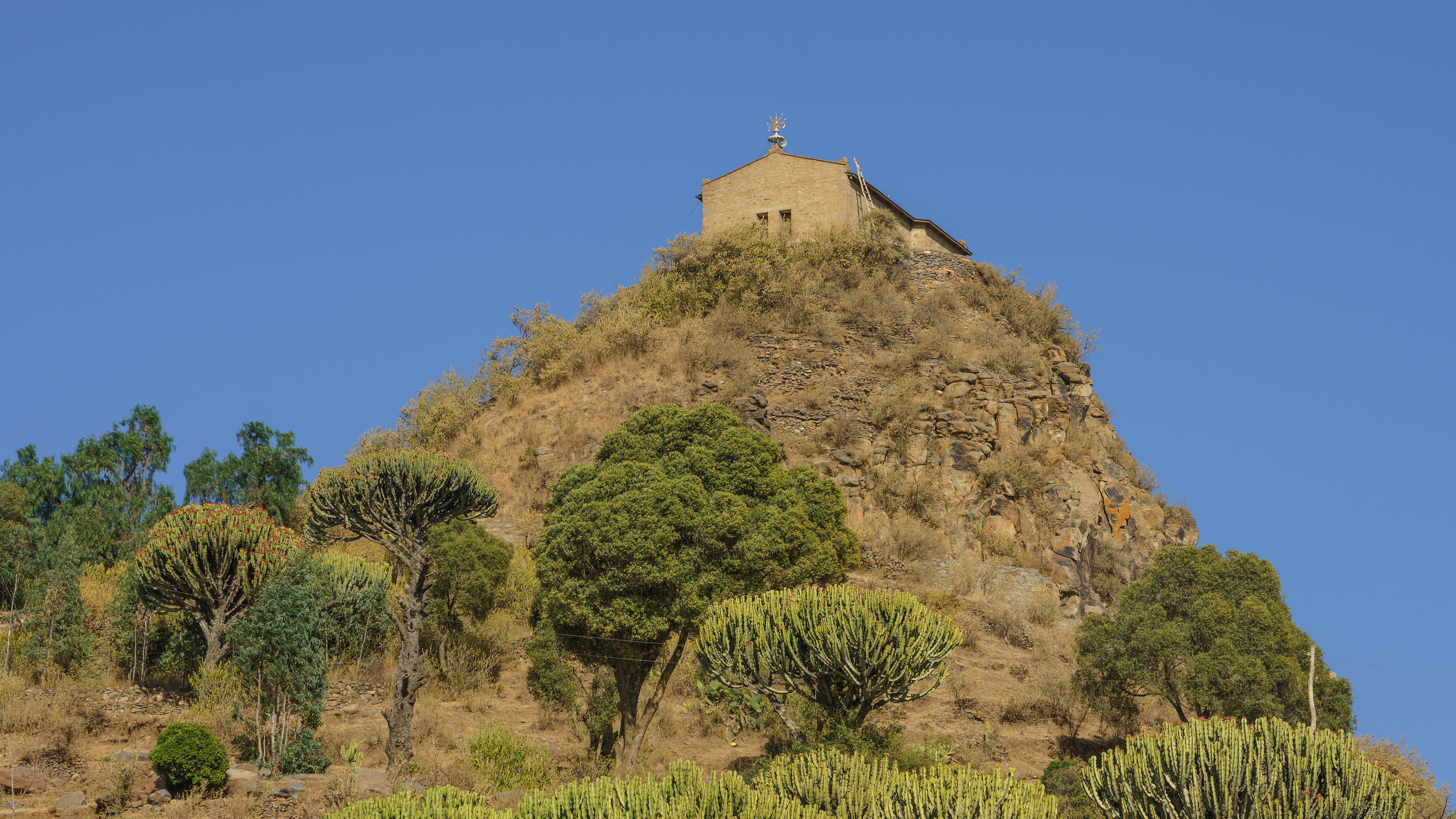
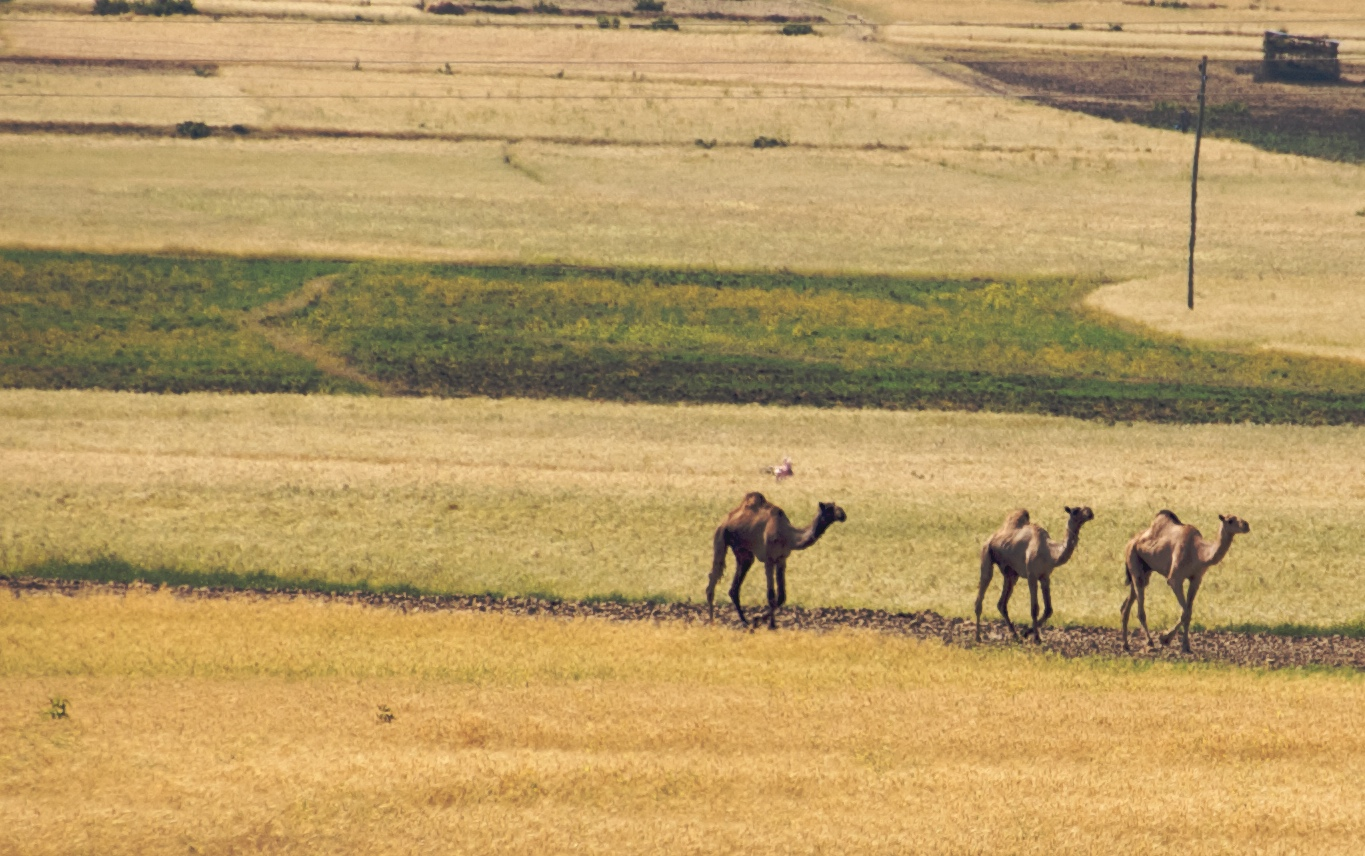
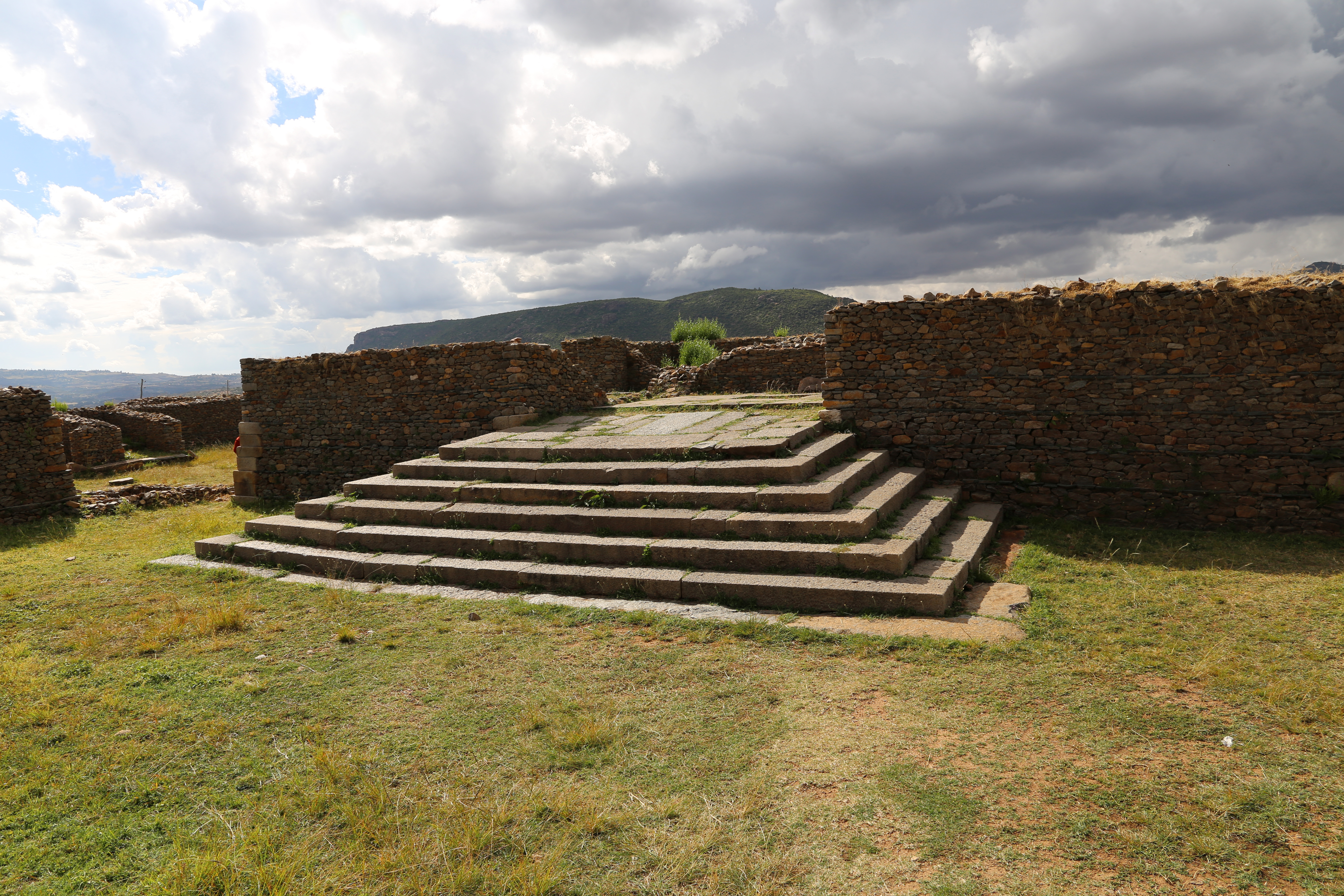
- From top to bottom, left to right: skyline of Axum, Northern Stelae Park, Chapel of the Tablet at the Church of Our Lady Mary of Zion, Abba Pantelewon, farmlands in Axum, ruins of Dungur.

- Location within Ethiopia Location within Africa
- Coordinates: 14°7′15″N 38°43′40″E
- Country: Ethiopia
- Region: Tigray
- Zone: Central
- Elevation: 2,131 m (6,991 ft)

Population (2022)
  - Total: 94,515

UNESCO World Heritage Site
- Criteria: Cultural: i, iv
- Reference: 15
- Inscription: 1980 (4th Session)

Axum, also spelled Aksum (/ˈɑːksuːm/), is a town in the Tigray Region of Ethiopia with a population of 66,900 residents (as of 2015). It is the site of the historic capital of the Aksumite Empire.

Axum is located in the Central Zone of the Tigray Region, near the base of the Adwa mountains. It has an elevation of 2,131 metres (6,991 feet) and is surrounded by La'ilay Maychew, a separately administered woreda of the Tigray region.

In 1980, UNESCO added Axum's archaeological sites to its list of World Heritage Sites due to their historic value. Prior to the beginning of the Tigray War in 2020, Axum was a leading tourist destination for foreign visitors.

== History ==
=== Ancient ===
Little information is available regarding the early centuries of Aksum's presumed evolution from a humble regional hub to a dominant power. Archeological findings at Gobadra (Gobo Dara) and the Anqar Baahti rock-shelters suggest Stone Age remnants in close proximity. R. Fattovich's excavations at amba 'Beta Giyorgis above Aksum validate the pre-Aksumite roots of a settlement in Aksum dating back to approximately 7th to 4th centuries B.C. Excavations in the Stele Park at the heart of Aksum substantiate ongoing activity in that area since the beginning of the common era. By the 1st century AD, Aksum was described as a "metropolis" in the Periplus of the Erythraean Sea.

Several archaeological expeditions have conducted excavations in various parts of Aksum. The early utilization of stelae, or obelisks as grave markers, is documented, evolving over time to encompass some of the world's largest monuments. Initially, the granite stelae in the primary cemetery, housing the Aksumite royal tombs, and in other cemeteries around the town were plain and rough. Subsequently, they became plain but carefully dressed in granite, eventually carved to emulate multi-storey towers in a distinctive architectural style. The Aksumite architecture is characterized by massive dressed granite blocks, smaller uncut stones for walling, mud mortar to fix them, bricks for vaulting and arches, and an external wooden framework resembling "monkey-heads" or square corner extrusions. The walls tend to incline inwards as they ascend, often featuring several recessed bays for added strength. A comparable architectural style is evident in substantial "palace" structures not only in Axum but also in other cities like Adulis and Matara. The presence of a large reservoir, now known as May Sum, below the hill called May Oho, may trace back to Aksumite times, indicating the city's reliable water supply. Axum likely had a prosperous agricultural vicinity, evident from wheat depicted on Aksumite coins, abundant livestock, local forests supplying firewood for centuries, and various industries such as metalworking, glassware, and pottery. The Aksumites' achievements in architecture and stone-working, along with evidence of ivory and leather-working, are found in Aksumite tombs.

Cosmas Indicopleustes, who visited Aksum in the second decade of the 6th century, described the four-towered palace of the king of Ethiopia, adorned with bronze statues of unicorns. Aksum also housed rows of monumental granite thrones, likely bearing metal statues dedicated to pre-Christian deities such as Astar, Baher, Madr, and Mahram. These thrones incorporated large panels with inscriptions, some attributed to Ousanas, Ezana, Kaleb, and his son Wazeba, chronicling their wars and serving as victory monuments. One inscription mentions Ezana setting up a throne "here in Sado," presumably a place in Aksum. Libraries in Aksum housed essential Christian documents, and Coptic monks translated many of these books in the 5th and 6th century. The Bible was translated into Ge'ez language, and the sole, complete surviving copy of the Book of Enoch is in the Ge'ez language.

Contact with the Byzantine Empire ceased after its eastern provinces were seized by the Arabs and as a consequence, Aksum grew poorer and more isolated. It ceased to be the political capital of the Kingdom of Aksum sometime after the 8th century, which was relocated to the south. An inscription, crafted by a certain Hasani 'Dano'el, mentions his success in subjugating the king of Aksum and reducing the city to the status of a tributary to his own kingdom in the 9th century. It is conceivable that the ecological damage extended to the surrounding area of Aksum due to increasing demands for foodstuffs and firewood. The region around the town might have eventually become incapable of sustaining the population of a major political center. By the end of the 9th century, Aksum was largely abandoned and lay in ruins.

=== Medieval ===
The city rose to prominence again after the rise of the Solomonic Dynasty, and became the spiritual capital of the Ethiopian Empire. A collection of Ge'ez documents, encompassing a concise legendary history of Aksum, land charters, and other related material, known as the Book of Axum, is occasionally discovered bound within manuscript books alongside the Kebra Nagast and other works. This compilation provides numerous insights into the church's possessions and the subsequent history of the town. The city also had its own governor known as the Nebure Id, who was also a high dignitary of the church. The Kebra Nagast was written by Nebure Id Yishaq of Aksum, but Aksum is never mentioned by name in the book. Instead, the "city of the kingdom" is called Dabra Makadda.

The Aksum Seyon was restored by Dawit I in 1406. It has been rumored to house the Biblical Ark of the Covenant, in which lie the Tablets of Stone upon which the Ten Commandments are inscribed. Zara Yaqob underwent his coronation there in 1436 and continued to reside in Aksum for three years. Subsequently, a few other monarchs also chose Aksum as the site for their coronation ceremonies. This unique ritual involved cutting a cord held by the "daughters of Aksum," symbolizing the king's ascent to "king of Zion." The ancient Aksumite stone thrones served as coronation chairs, although the "coronation" itself comprised an anointing and tonsuring ritual, followed by a mass in the church.

Francisco Alvares, a Portuguese missionary and explorer who spent eight months in Aksum in the 1520s described it as "a large town with very good houses and very good wells of water of very beautiful worked masonry, and also in most of the houses ancient figures of lions and dogs and birds, all well made in very hard, fine stone" He also described Church of Our Lady Mary of Zion, the stelae, the thrones and other structures. Describing the church, he wrote: "A very noble church, the first there was in Ethiopia: it is named Mary of Syon. They say that it is so named because its altar stone came from Sion. In this country (as they say) they have the custom always to name the churches by the altar stone, because on it is written the name of the patron saint. This stone which they have in this church, they say that the apostles sent it from Mount Sion. This church is very large; it has five aisles of good width and of great length, vaulted above, and all the vaults closed, the ceiling and sides all painted. Below, the body of the church is well worked with handsome cut stone; it has seven chapels, all with their backs to the east, and their altars well ornamented. It has a choir after our fashion, except that it is low, and they reach the vaulted roof with their heads; and the choir is also over the vault, and they do not use it. This church has a very large circuit, paved with flagstones like the lids of tombs. This consists of a very high wall, and it is not covered over like those of the other churches, but is left open. This church has a large enclosure, and it is also surrounded with another larger enclosure, like the enclosing wall of a large town or city. Within this enclosure are handsome groups of one storey buildings, and all spout out their water by strong figures of lions and dogs of stone [of different colours]. Inside this large enclosure there are two mansions, one on the right hand and the other on the left, which belong to the two rectors of the church; and the other houses are of canons and monks."

Adal leader Ahmed ibn Ibrahim al-Ghazi led the conquest of Axum in the sixteenth century. Aksum was sacked and burned in 1535 by the troops of Ahmad ibn Ibrahim al-Ghazi who destroyed the church that Alvares had described. Before the city was sacked, a document in the Book of Aksum lists 1,705 golden objects as well as many other items from Aksum that Lebna Dengel distributed to various governors to save them from destruction, and it is recorded by Ahmad's chronicler that a large stone object was removed at this time for safety to "Tabr".

Manuel de Almeida who visited after the convulsions of Ahmed ibn Ibrahim al-Ghazi confirmed the extent of the ruin that befell Aksum in the 16th century commenting that it then had only about 100 inhabitants where everywhere there are ruins to be seen.

The city was rebuilt in 1580 by Emperor Sarsa Dengel who restored the church and held his coronation there.

=== 17th century ===
In 1604/05 the city was visited by the Jesuit Fernao Guerreiro, he reported that the church had a nave, two aisles, and a thatched roof. It is possible that some elements of the internal architecture from the former church endured, including the outer walls, within which the smaller new church was situated. In 1608, during the coronation of Susenyos I in Aksum, Mass was conducted at this location. However in 1611, Aksum was sacked by Oromo, who set fire to the church. Pedro Páez who visited Aksum in around 1620 saw only about 150-200 mud houses, and Manoel Barradas wrote that Aksum was no more than a small village.

In 1655, Fasilides had the church restored. Its dedication was celebrated by his daughter, Princess Yodit, who gave "an incalculable quantity of money", so that the church became "marvellous and magnificent". In 1678, rebels under Ras 'Faris, governor of Salawa, burned Aksum, but the church survived to serve at the coronation of Iyasu I in 1693.

=== 18th century ===
The French traveller Charles-Jacques Poncet visited Aksum (which he called "Heleni") in 1700, describing the stelae and the church. James Bruce also left descriptions of the old town, which in his time consisted, he estimated, of about 600 houses. He believed Aksum to have been mainly the work of the Ptolemies, crediting most of the monuments to Ptolemy III Euergetes.

After the decline of imperial authority in the period of the Zemene Mesafint, Aksum fell under the control of the rulers of Tigray. One of whom, Wolde Selassie, would grant the church of St. Mary a land grant in 1794.

=== 19th century ===
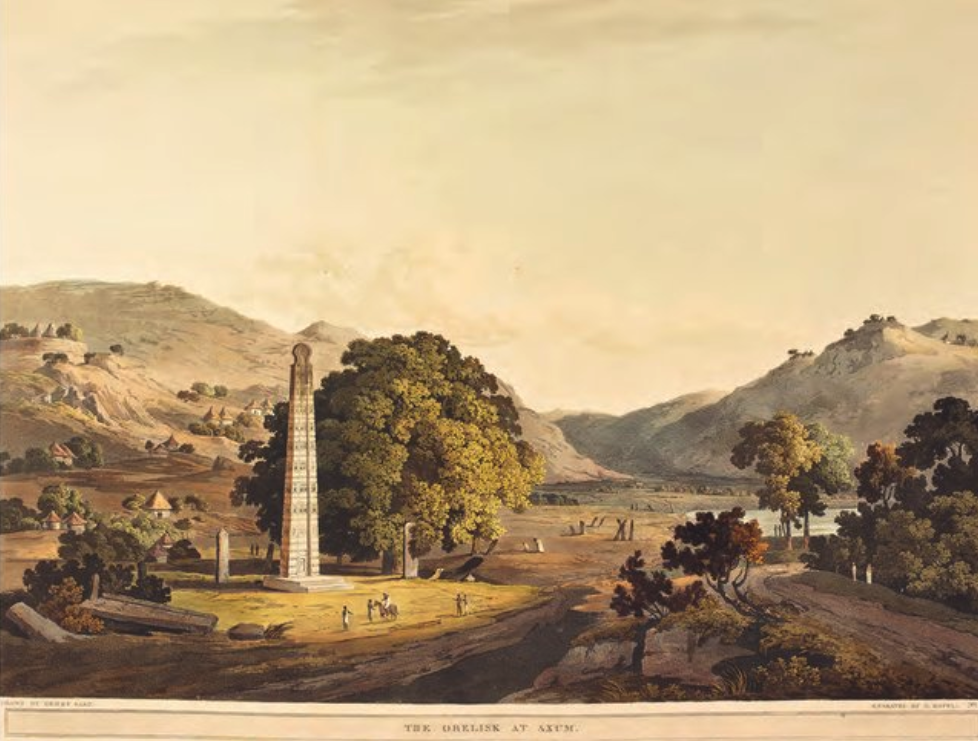
Sketch of the Obelisk of Axum by Henry Salt, 1809

According to the missionary Samuel Gobat, in the early 19th century Aksum was economically well off, as it was situated in a "vast fertile plain" which was "richly cultivated". Apart from the ruins, the settlement was made up almost entirely of round huts with thatched roofs.

The warlord Wube Haile Maryam, gave a land grant to the Church of St. Mary in an undated charter.

On 12 January 1872, Yohannes IV was crowned Emperor of Ethiopia in the city of Aksum.

In February 1893 the British explorers, James Theodore Bent and his wife Mabel Bent, travelled by boat to Massawa on the west coast of the Red Sea. They then made their way overland to excavate at Axum and Yeha, in the hope of researching possible links between early trading networks and cultures on both sides of the Red Sea. They reached Axum by 24 February 1893, but their work was curtailed by the tensions between the Italian occupiers and local warlords, together with the continuing ramifications of the First Italo-Ethiopian War and they had to make a hasty retreat by the end of March to Zula for passage back to England.

The British journalist Augustus B. Wylde wrote after visiting Aksum in 1897: "after every heavy downpour of rain, old coins are washed out of the soil, the local boys were delighted to accompany a stranger about the place. They were intelligent, sharp-eyed little urchins who took a great interest in the search for curiosities, though unless someone is there to reward them for finding the old coins they do not trouble to pick them up, as they are of no value to them."

=== 20th century ===
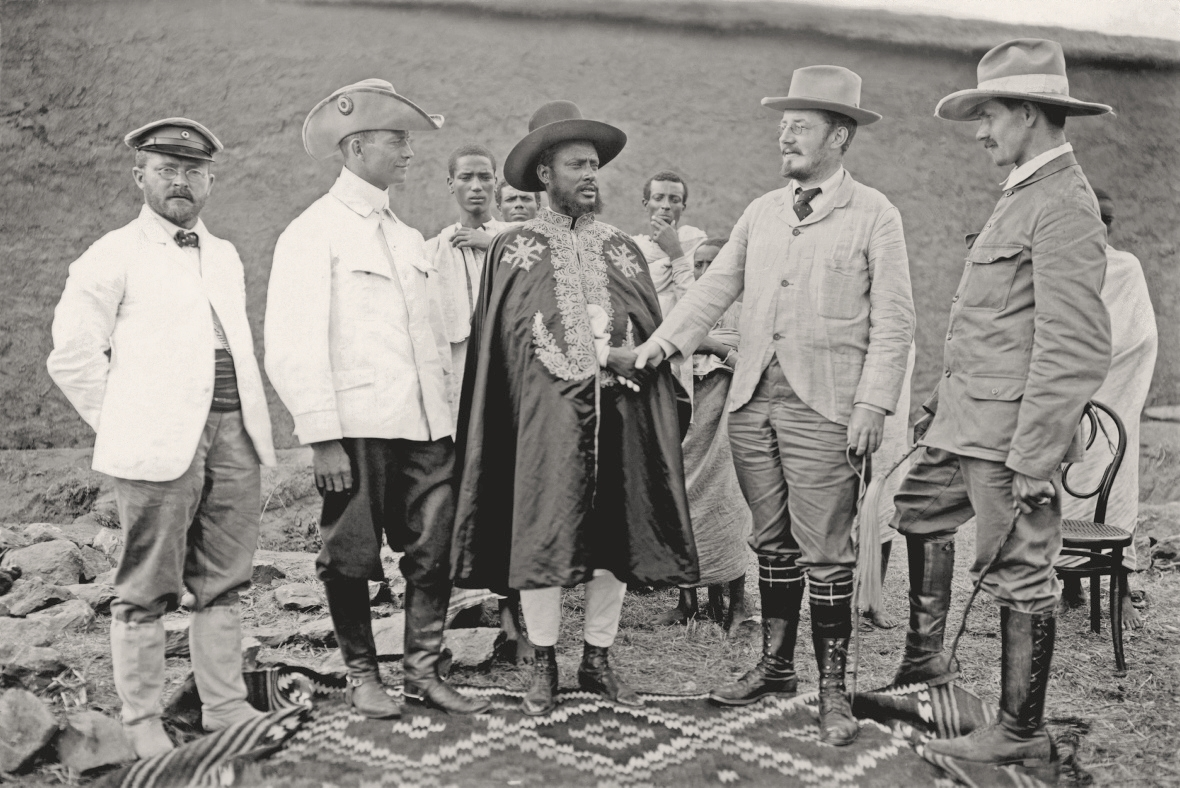
German "Aksum Expedition", February 1906. From left: Theodor von Lüpke, Dr. Erich Kaschke, Dejazmach Gebreselassie Bariagaber (Governor of Tigray), Enno Littmann and Daniel Krencker

Aksumite remains were investigated in 1906 by an important German archaeological mission led by the renowned scholar Enno Littmann.

Early in the Second Italo-Ethiopian War, Italian troops seized Aksum in October 1935. In 1937, a 24 m (79 ft) tall, 1,700-year-old Obelisk of Axum, was broken into five parts by the Italians and shipped to Rome to be erected. The obelisk is widely regarded as one of the finest examples of engineering from the height of the Axumite empire. Despite a 1947 United Nations agreement that the obelisk would be shipped back, Italy balked, resulting in a long-standing diplomatic dispute with the Ethiopian government, which views the obelisk as a symbol of national identity.

Street scenes and daily life in Axum, filmed in 1961

During the Ethiopian Civil War, on 30 March 1989, Axum was bombed from the air by the Ethiopian Air Force and three people were killed.

=== 21st century ===
In April 2005, Italy finally returned the obelisk pieces to Axum amidst much official and public rejoicing; Italy also covered the US$4 million costs of the transfer. UNESCO assumed responsibility for the re-installation of this stele in Axum, and by the end of July 2008 the obelisk had been reinstalled. It was unveiled on 4 September 2008.

During the Tigray War, around 100–800 civilians were massacred by the Eritrean Army between 28 November and 15 December 2020.

== Main sites of Axum ==
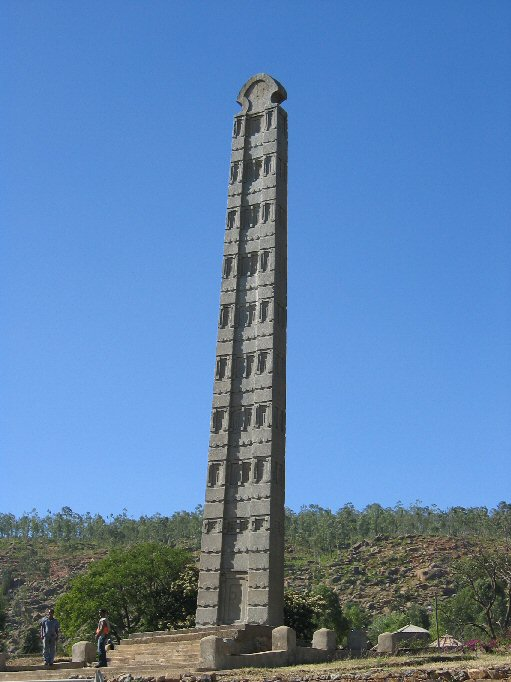
King Ezana's Stele, in Axum, Ethiopia

The major Aksumite monuments in the town are steles. These obelisks are around 1,700 years old and have become a symbol of the Ethiopian people's identity. The largest number are in the Northern Stelae Park, ranging up to the 33-metre-long (108 ft) (Note: 3.84 m (12.6 ft) wide, 2.35 m (7 ft 9 in) deep, weighing 520 t (510 long tons; 570 short tons)) Great Stele, believed to have fallen and broken during construction. The Obelisk of Axum (Note: 24.6 m (81 ft) high, 2.32 m (7 ft 7 in) wide, 1.36 m (4 ft 6 in) deep, weighing 170 t (170 long tons; 190 short tons)) was removed by the Italian army in 1937, and returned to Ethiopia in 2005 and reinstalled 31 July 2008. The next tallest is the 24 m (79 ft) (Note: 20.6 m (68 ft) high above the front baseplate, 2.65 m (8 ft 8 in) wide, 1.18 m (3 ft 10 in) deep, weighing 160 t (160 long tons; 180 short tons)) King Ezana's Stele. Three more stelae measure 18.2 m (60 ft) high, (Note: 1.56 m (5 ft 1 in) wide, 0.76 m (2 ft 6 in) deep, weighing 56 t (55 long tons; 62 short tons)) 15.8 m (52 ft) high, (Note: 2.35 m (7 ft 9 in) wide, 1 m (3 ft 3 in) deep, weighing 75 t (74 long tons; 83 short tons)) 15.3 m (50 ft) high. (Note: 1.47 m (4 ft 10 in) wide, 0.78 m (2 ft 7 in) deep, weighing 43 t (42 long tons; 47 short tons)) The stelae are believed to mark graves and would have had cast metal discs affixed to their sides, which are also carved with architectural designs. The Gudit Stelae to the west of town, unlike the northern area, are interspersed with mostly 4th century tombs.

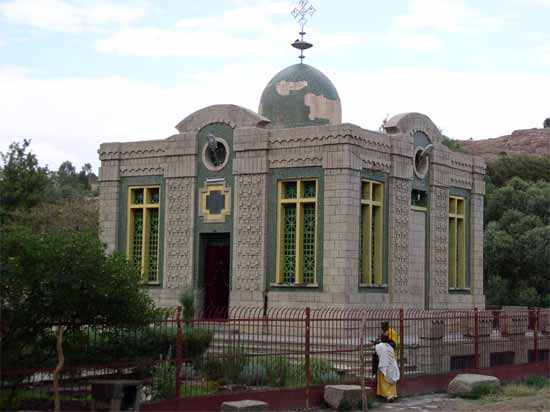
The Chapel of the Tablet

The other major features of the town are the old and new churches of Our Lady Mary of Zion. The Church of Our Lady Mary of Zion was built in 1665 by Emperor Fasilides and said to have previously housed the Ark of the Covenant. The original cathedral, said to have been built by Ezana and augmented several times afterwards, was believed to have been massive with an estimated 12 naves. It was burned to the ground by Gudit, rebuilt, and then destroyed again during the Abyssinian–Adal war of the 1500s. It was again rebuilt by Emperor Gelawdewos (completed by his brother and successor Emperor Minas) and Emperor Fasilides replaced that structure with the present one. Only men are permitted entry into the Old St. Mary's Cathedral (some say as a result of the destruction of the original church by Gudit). The New Cathedral of St. Mary of Zion stands next to the old one, and was built to fulfil a pledge by Emperor Haile Selassie to Our Lady of Zion for the liberation of Ethiopia from the Fascist occupation. Built in a neo-Byzantine style, work on the new cathedral began in 1955, and allows entry to women. Emperor Haile Selassie interrupted the state visit of Queen Elizabeth II to travel to Axum to attend the dedication of the new cathedral and pay personal homage, showing the importance of this church in the Ethiopian Empire. Queen Elizabeth visited the Cathedral a few days later. Between the two cathedrals is a small chapel known as The Chapel of the Tablet built at the same time as the new cathedral, and which is believed to house the Ark of the Covenant. Emperor Haile Selassie's consort, Empress Menen Asfaw, paid for its construction from her private funds. Admittance to the chapel is closed to all but the guardian monk who resides there. Entrance is even forbidden to the Patriarch of the Orthodox Church, and to the Emperor of Ethiopia during the monarchy. The two cathedrals and the chapel of the Ark are the focus of pilgrimage and considered the holiest sites in Ethiopia to members of its Orthodox Church.

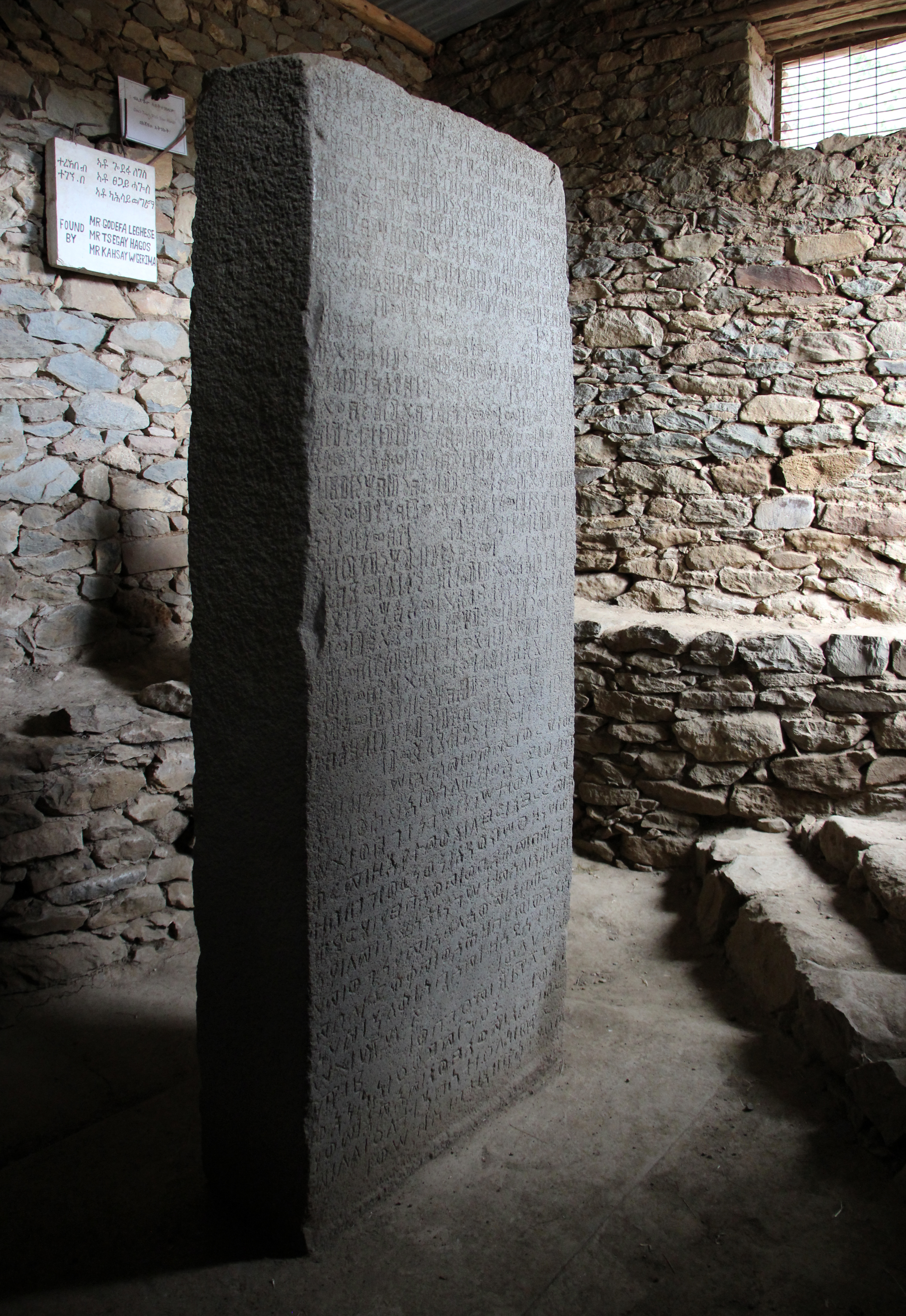
The Ezana Stone, engraved from AD 330 to 356, is written in ancient Ge'ez, Sabaean and Greek.

Other attractions in Axum include archaeological and ethnographic museums, the Ezana Stone written in Sabaean, Geʽez and Ancient Greek in a similar manner to the Rosetta Stone, King Bazen's Tomb (a megalith considered to be one of the earliest structures), the so-called Queen of Sheba's Bath (actually a reservoir), the 4th-century Ta'akha Maryam and 6th-century Dungur palaces, Pentalewon Monastery and Abba Liqanos and about 2 km (1.2 mi) west is the rock art called the Lioness of Gobedra.

Local legend claims the Queen of Sheba lived in the town.

== Climate ==
The Köppen-Geiger climate classification system classifies Axum's climate as subtropical highland (Cwb), although it is very close to being a semi-arid climate (BSh/BSk).

Climate data for Axum
Month	Jan	Feb	Mar	Apr	May	Jun	Jul	Aug	Sep	Oct	Nov	Dec	Year
Mean daily maximum °C (°F)	25.9 (78.6)	27.2 (81.0)	28.6 (83.5)	29.4 (84.9)	28.8 (83.8)	27.0 (80.6)	22.5 (72.5)	22.3 (72.1)	24.8 (76.6)	26.3 (79.3)	26.8 (80.2)	25.7 (78.3)	26.3 (79.3)
Daily mean °C (°F)	16.7 (62.1)	17.8 (64.0)	17.7 (63.9)	21.0 (69.8)	20.8 (69.4)	19.7 (67.5)	17.2 (63.0)	17.4 (63.3)	17.9 (64.2)	17.9 (64.2)	17.4 (63.3)	16.2 (61.2)	18.1 (64.7)
Mean daily minimum °C (°F)	7.5 (45.5)	8.4 (47.1)	10.8 (51.4)	12.7 (54.9)	12.9 (55.2)	12.4 (54.3)	12.0 (53.6)	12.6 (54.7)	11.1 (52.0)	9.6 (49.3)	8.0 (46.4)	6.7 (44.1)	10.4 (50.7)
Average precipitation mm (inches)	3 (0.1)	2 (0.1)	9 (0.4)	27 (1.1)	31 (1.2)	67 (2.6)	221 (8.7)	199 (7.8)	67 (2.6)	12 (0.5)	13 (0.5)	1 (0.0)	652 (25.6)
Source: Climate-Data.org (altitude: 2,133 metres or 6,998 feet)

== Demographics ==
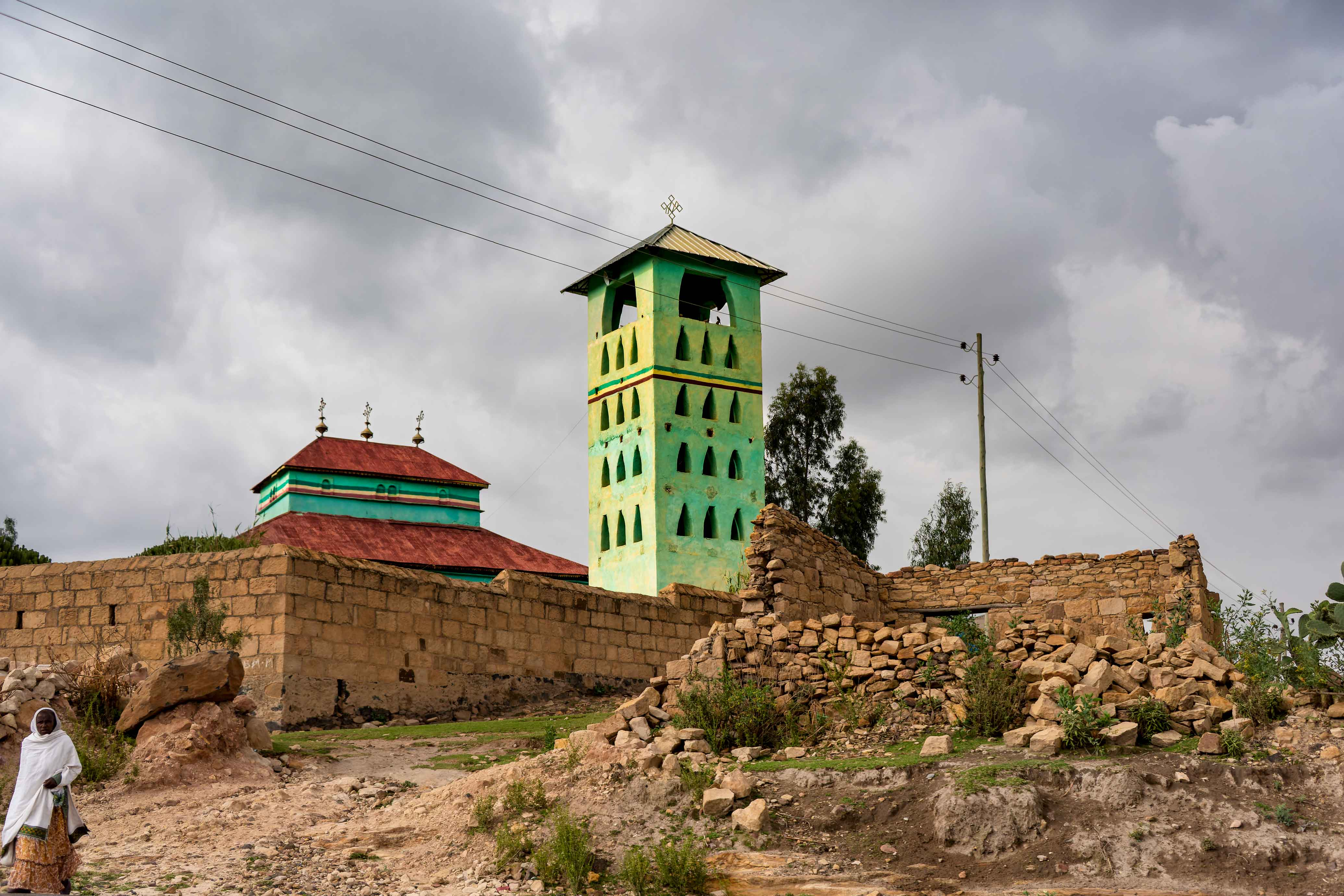
Axum in February 2022

According to the Central Statistical Agency of Ethiopia (CSA), as of 1 July 2012 the town of Axum's estimated population was 56,576. The census indicated that 30,293 of the population were females and 26,283 were males.

The 2007 national census showed that the town population was 44,647, of whom 20,741 were males and 23,906 females). The majority of the inhabitants said they practiced Ethiopian Orthodox Christianity, with 88.03% reporting that as their religion, while 10.89% of the population were Muslim.

In a 1969 book about her trek across Ethiopia on foot, the Irish travel writer Dervla Murphy states that the population of Axum was “about 20,000” of whom 500 were clergy.

The 1994 national census reported the population for the city as 27,148, of whom 12,536 were men and 14,612 were women. The largest ethnic group reported was Tigrayans with 98.54% and Tigrinya was spoken as a first language by 98.68%. The majority of the population practised Ethiopian Orthodox Christianity with 85.08% reported as embracing that religion, while 14.81% were Muslim.

== Transport ==
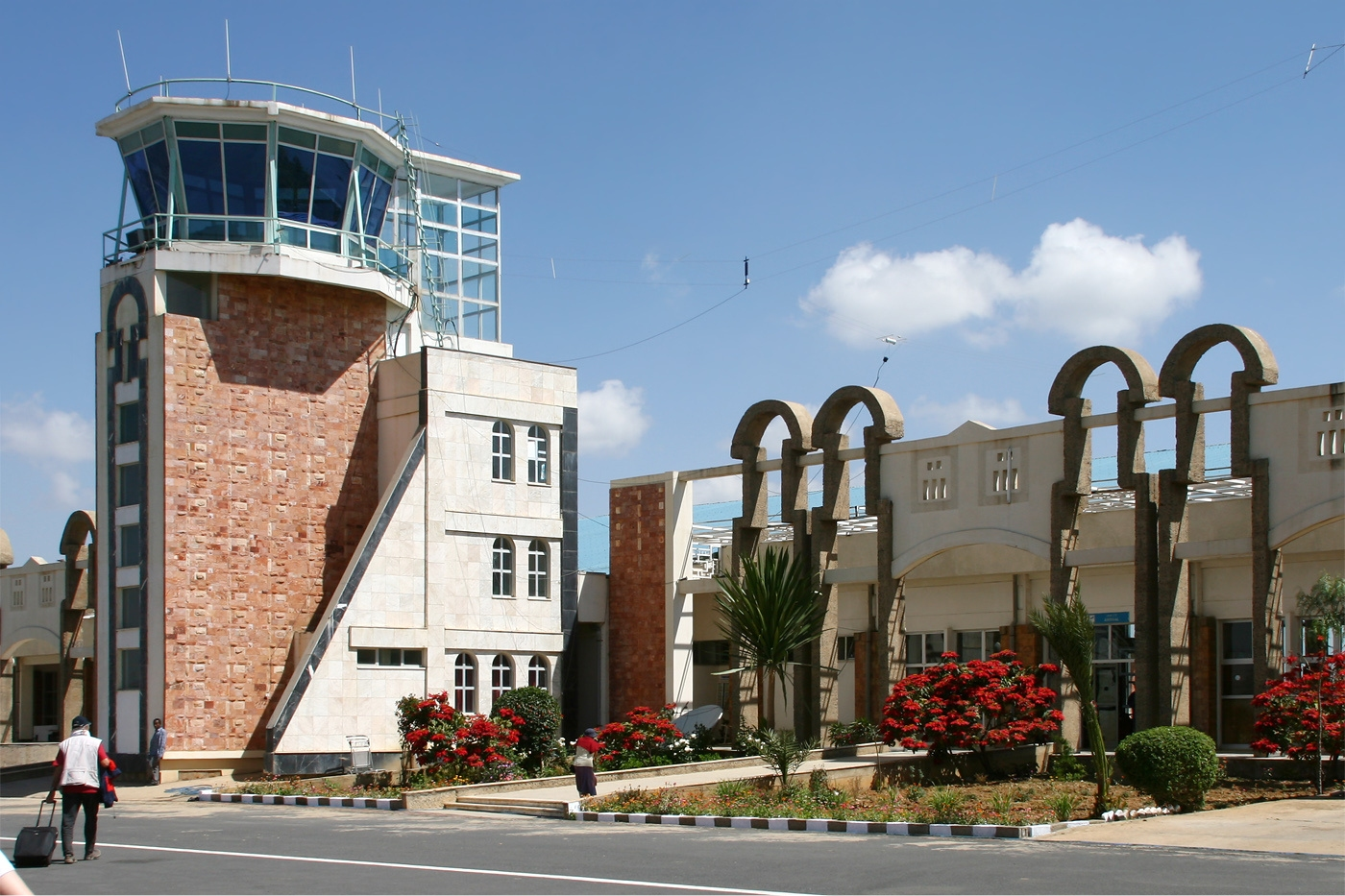
Axum Airport terminal building.

Axum Airport, also known as Emperor Yohannes IV Airport, is located just 5.5 km (3.4 miles) to the east of the city.

== Education ==
Aksum University was established in May 2006 on a greenfield site, 4 km (2.5 mi) from Axum's central area. The inauguration ceremony was held on 16 February 2007 and the current area of the campus is 107 ha (260 acres), with ample room for expansion. The establishment of a university in Axum is expected to contribute much to the ongoing development of the country in general and of the region in particular.

== Notable people ==
- Abune Mathias (b.in Sebuha 1941), among his titles he is the "Archbishop of Axum"
- Abay Tsehaye (1953–2021), politician and a founding member of the Tigray People's Liberation Front
- Zera Yacob (1599–1692), philosopher
- Zeresenay Alemseged (b. 1969), palaeoanthropologist and was Chair of the Anthropology Department at the California Academy of Sciences in San Francisco, United States

== Gallery ==
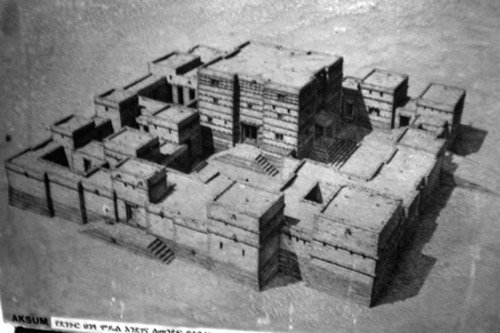
Reconstruction of Dungur

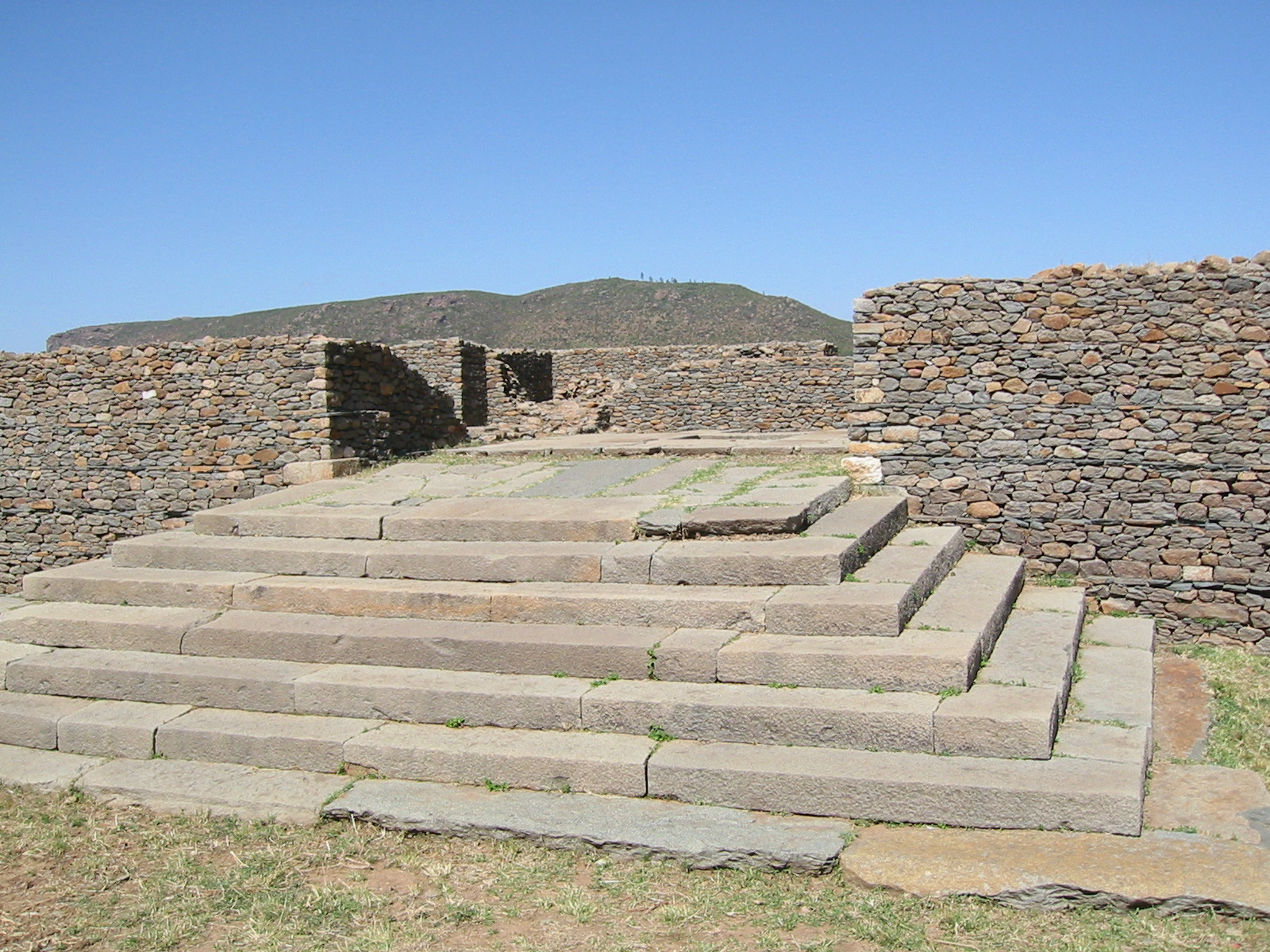
Dungur

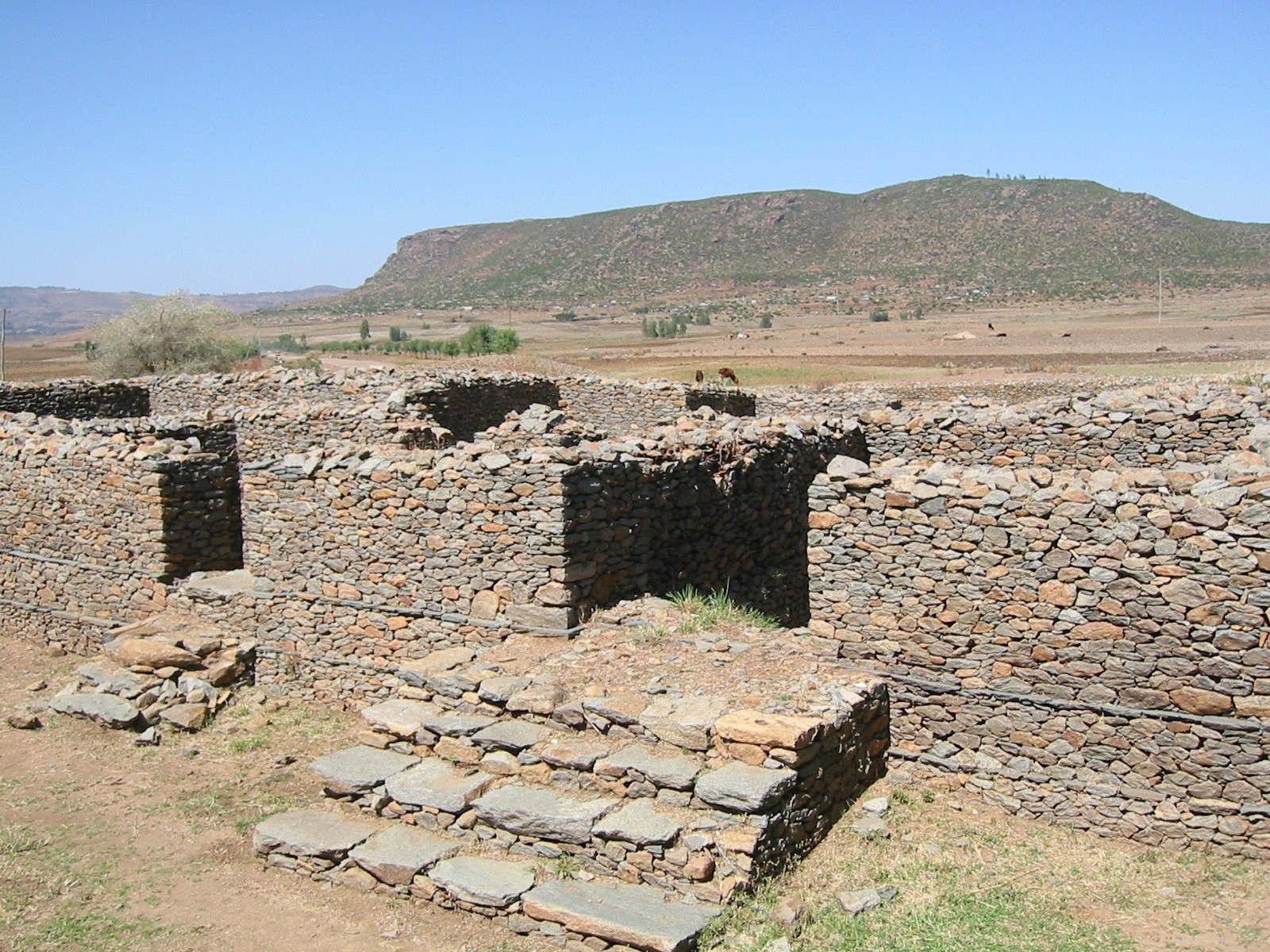
Dungur

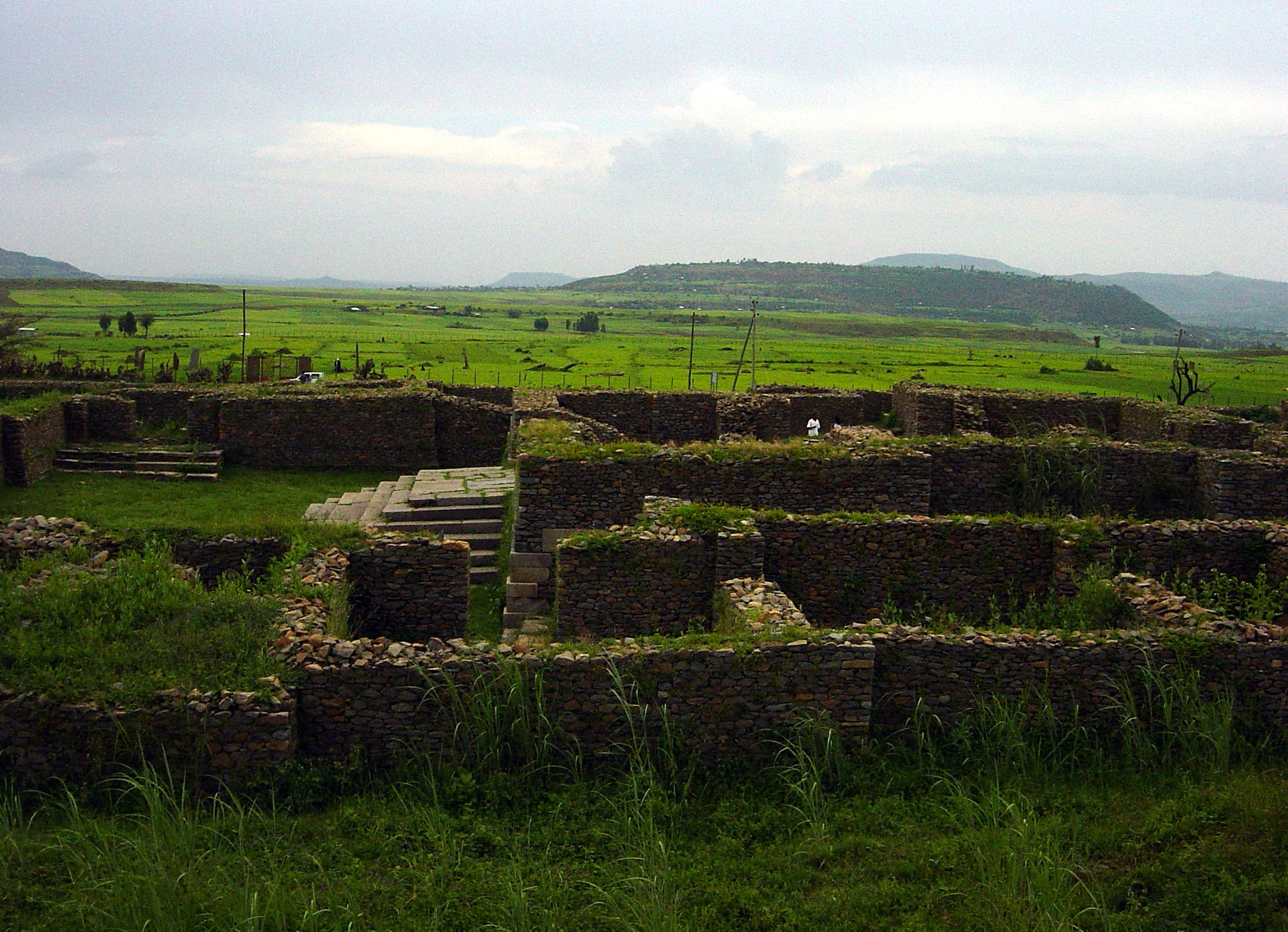
Dungur, with the Gudit stelae field immediately beyond it

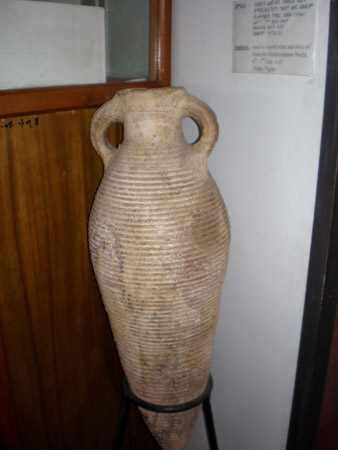
Aksumite-era Amphora from Asmara.

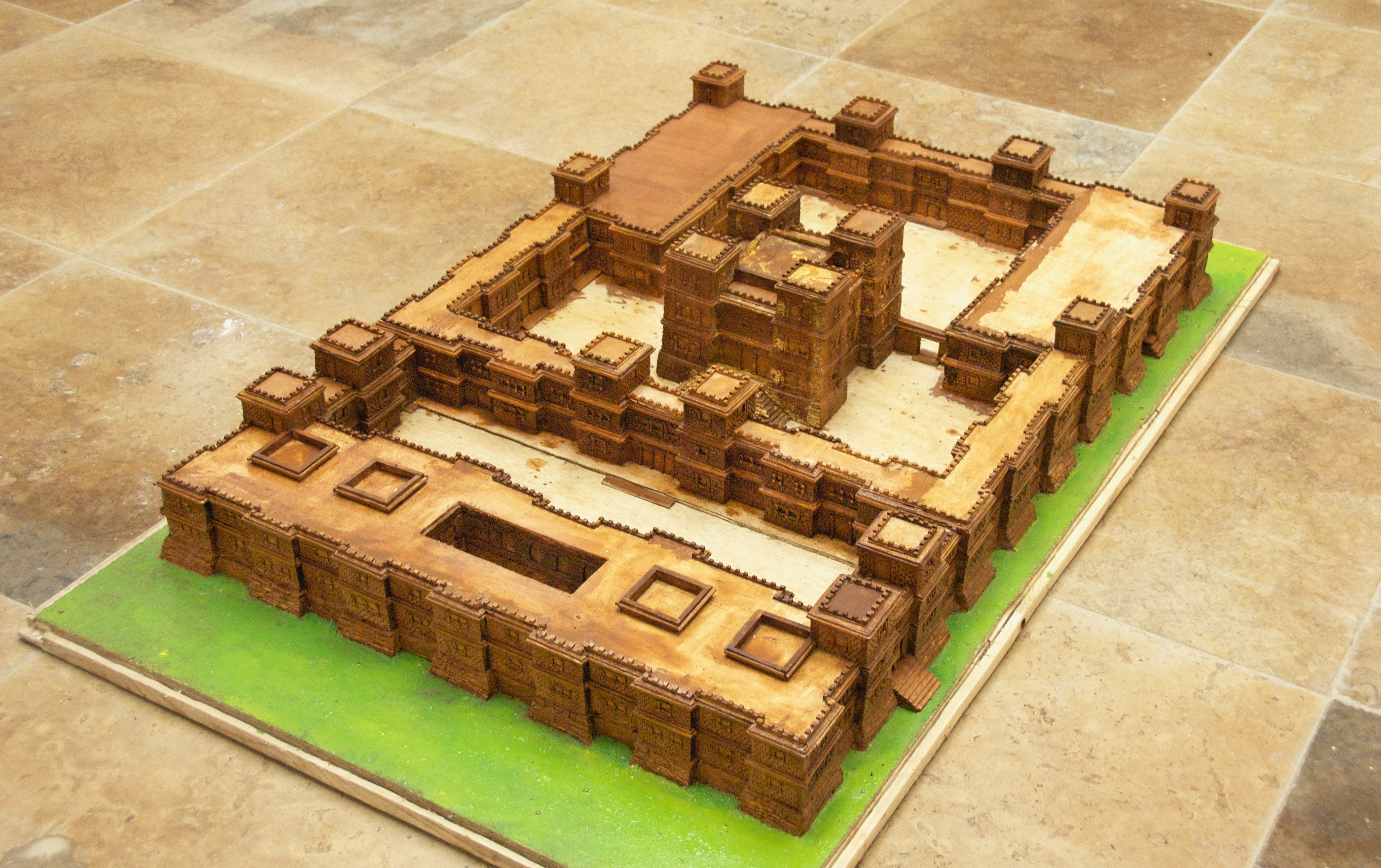
Model of the Ta'akha Maryam palace.

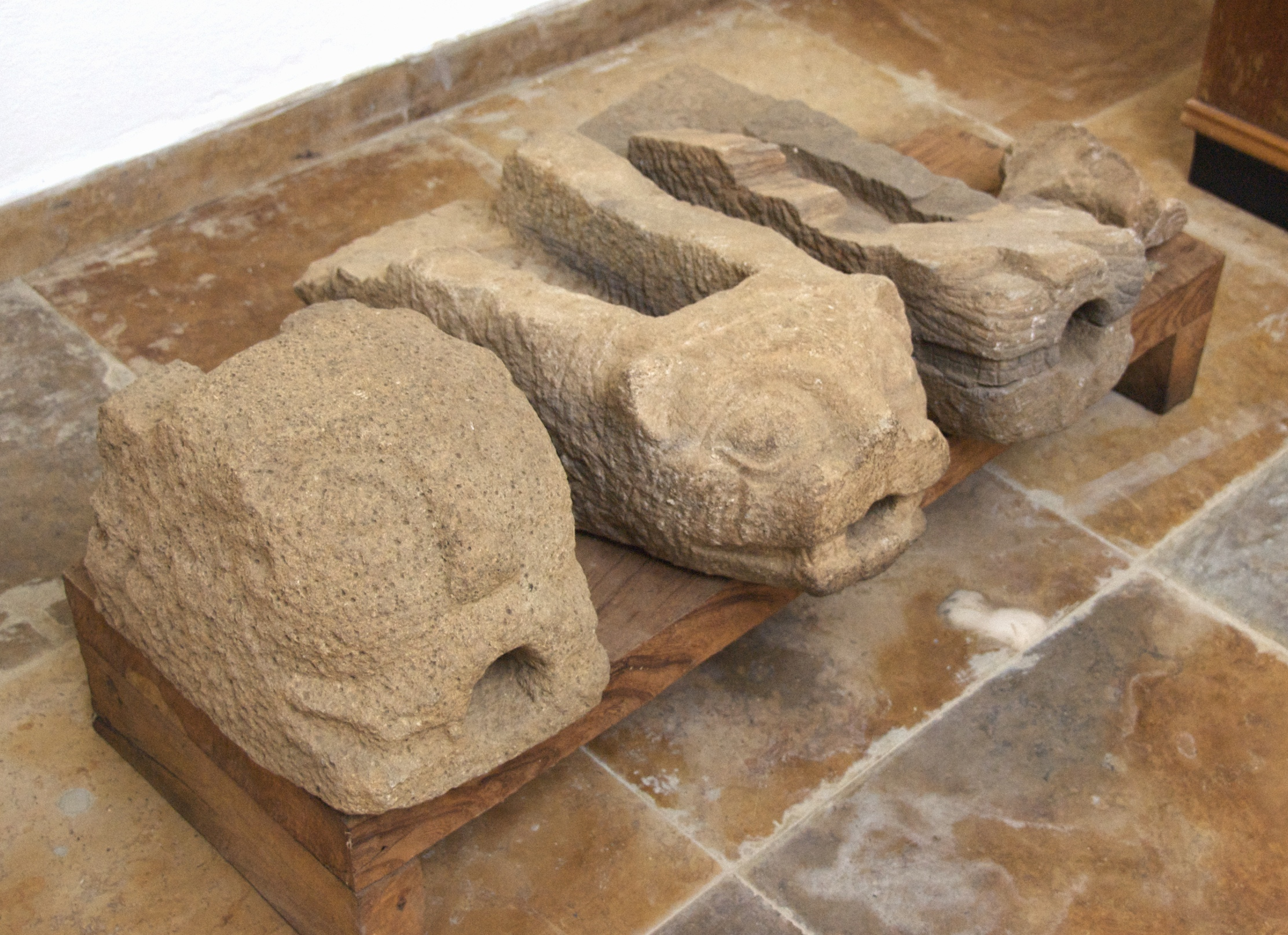
Aksumite water-spouts in the shape of lion heads.

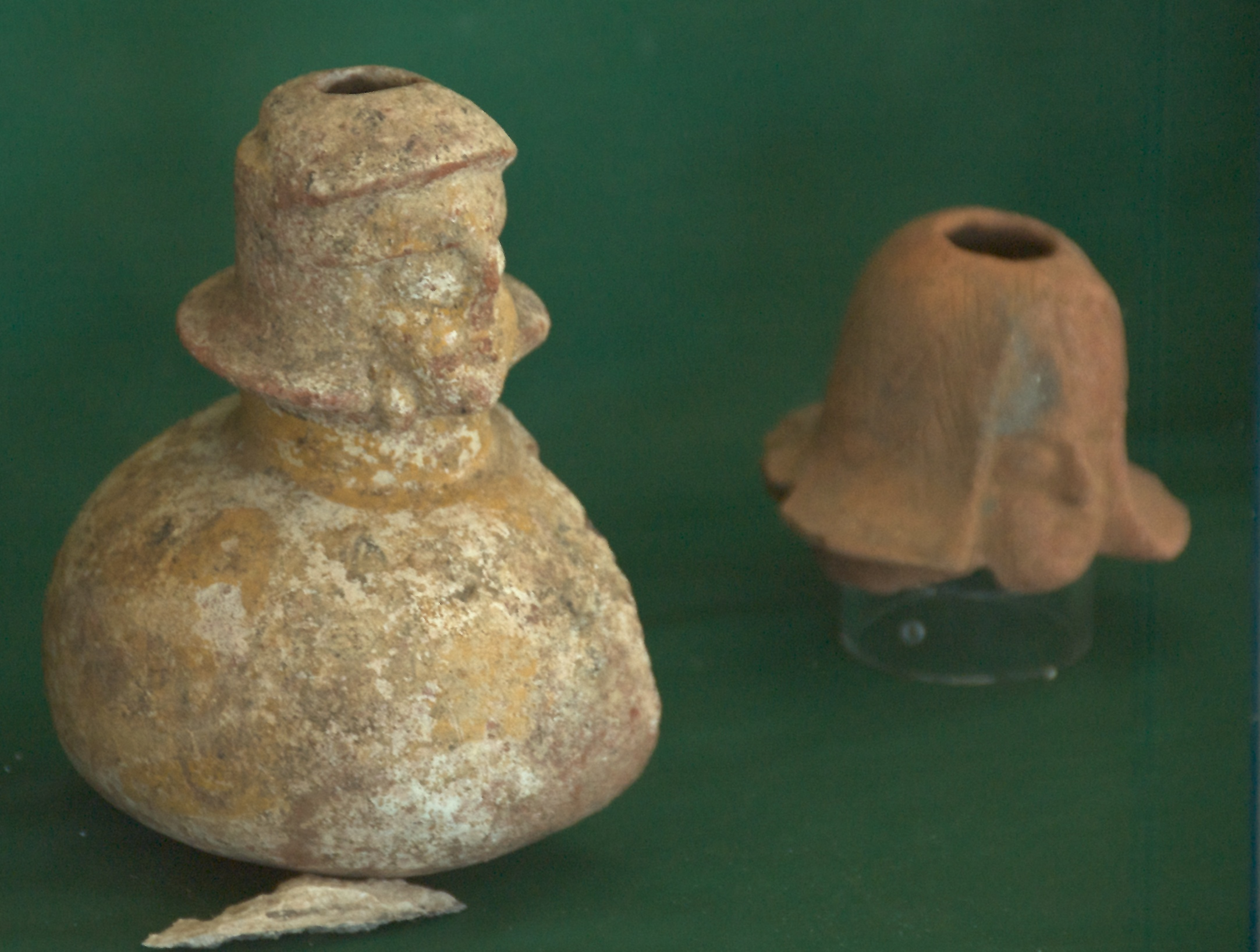
Aksumite jar with figural spout.

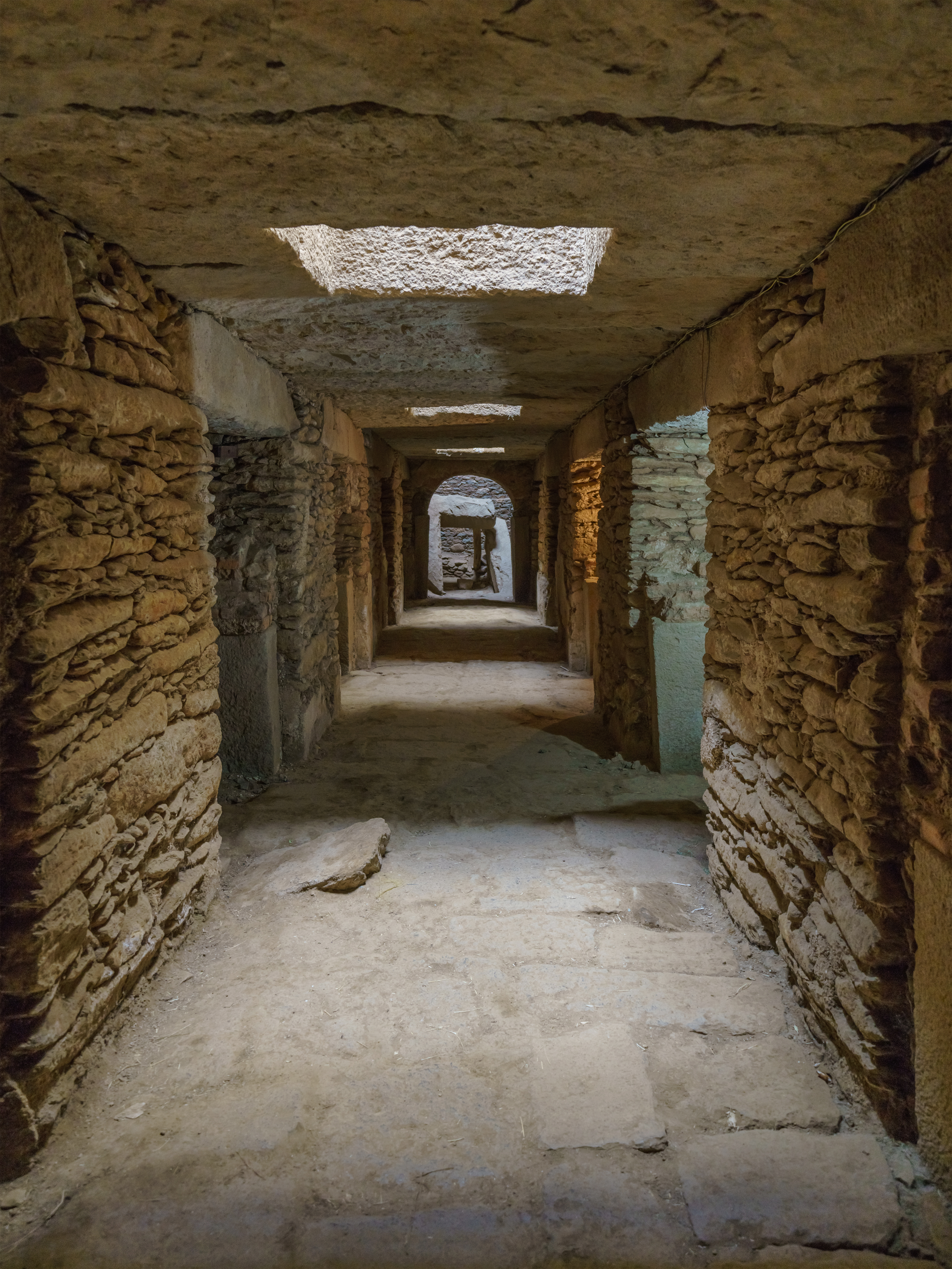
Tombs beneath the stele field.

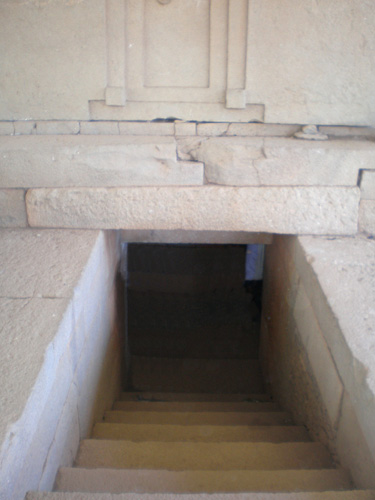
Entrance to the Tomb of the False Door.

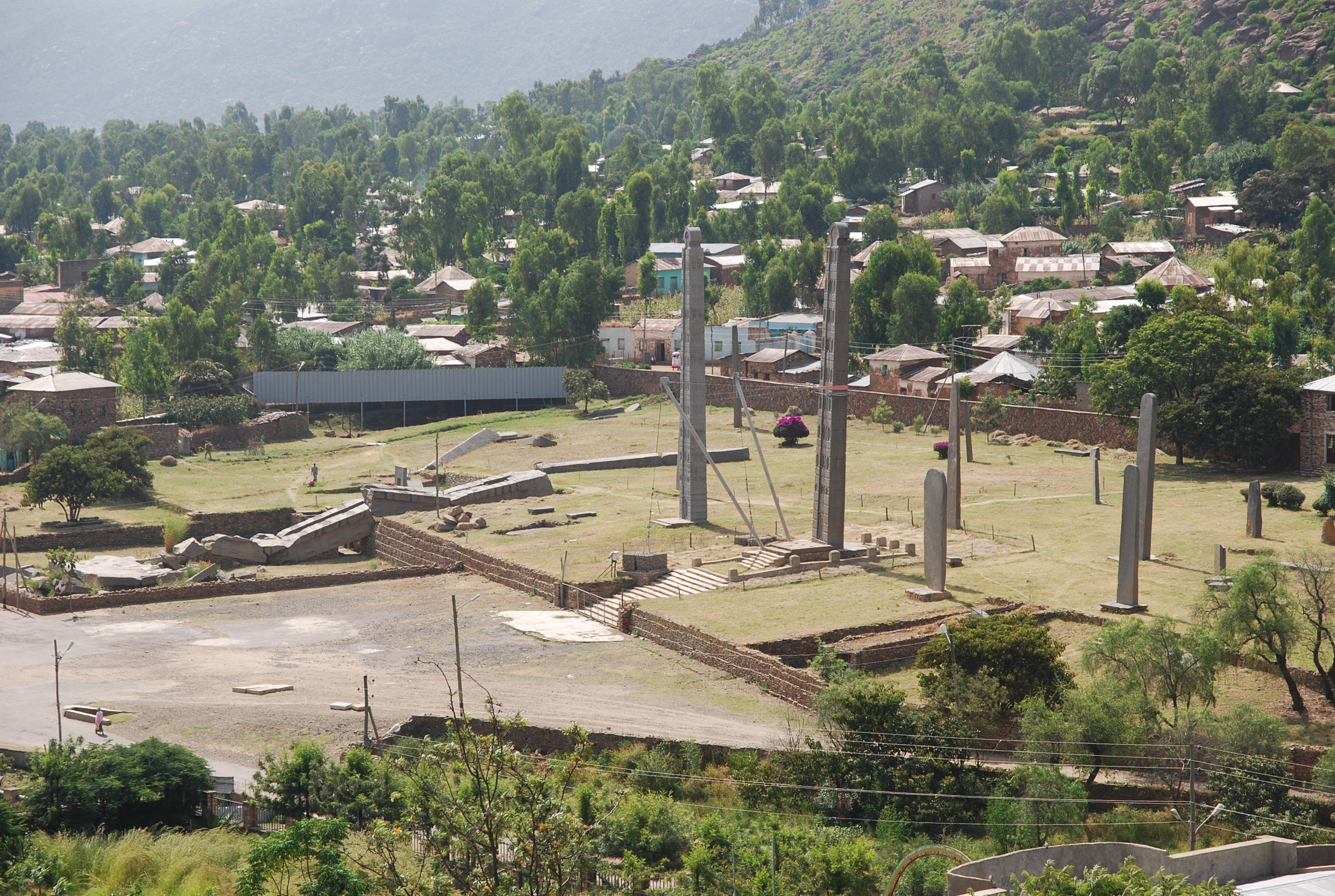
The Stelae Park in Axum.

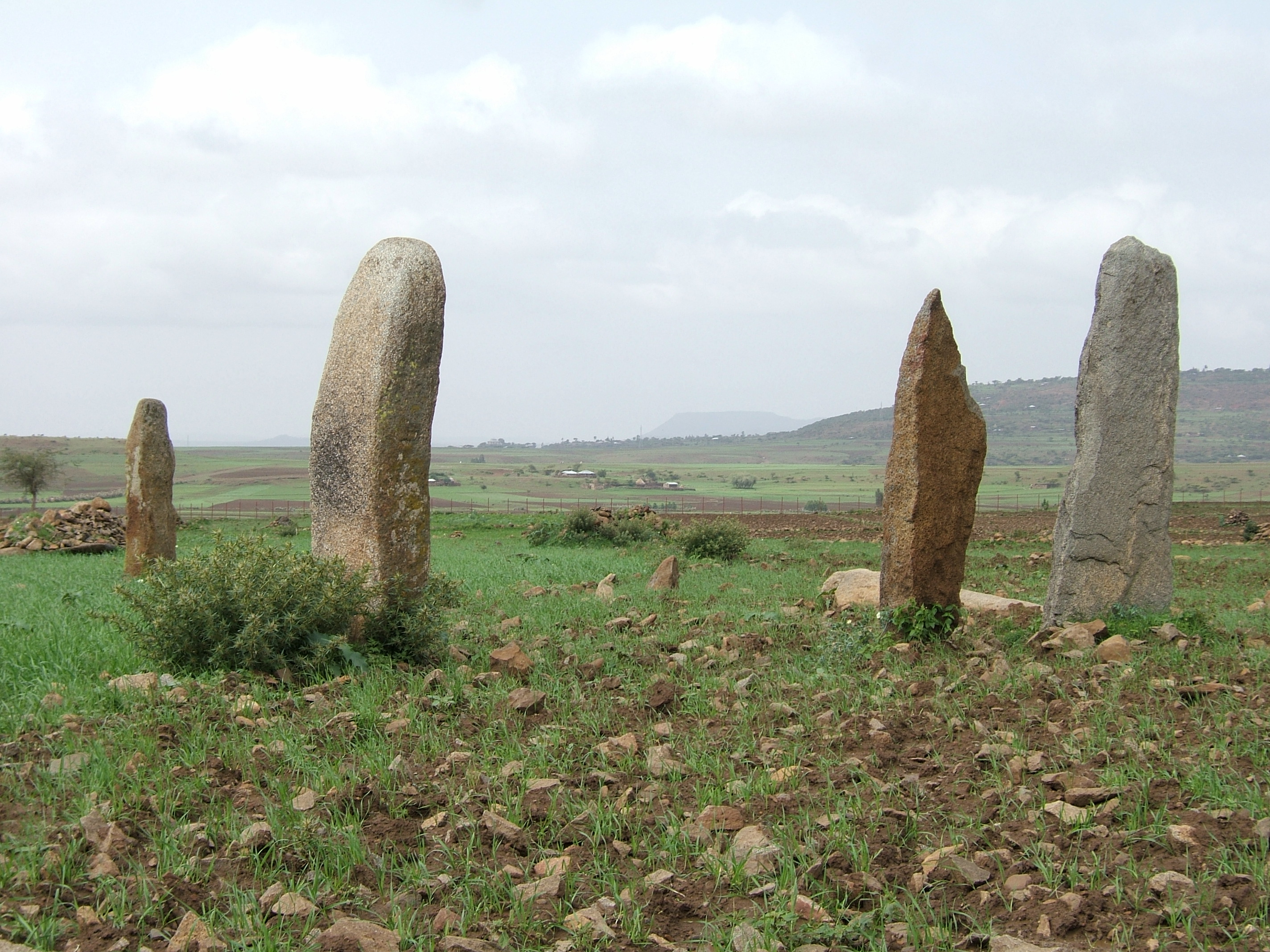
Small stelae in the Gudit Stelae Field

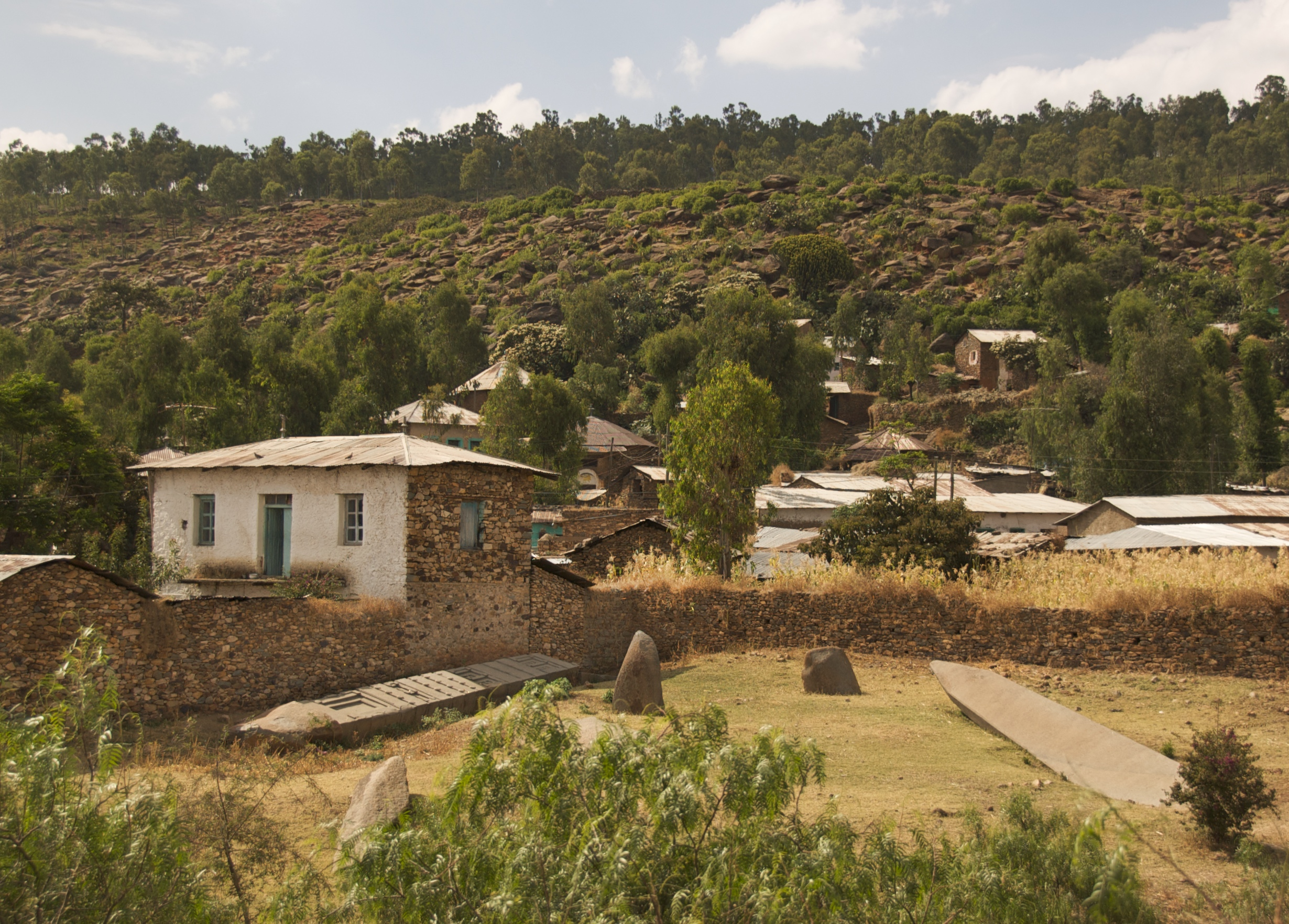
Another stelae field in Axum.

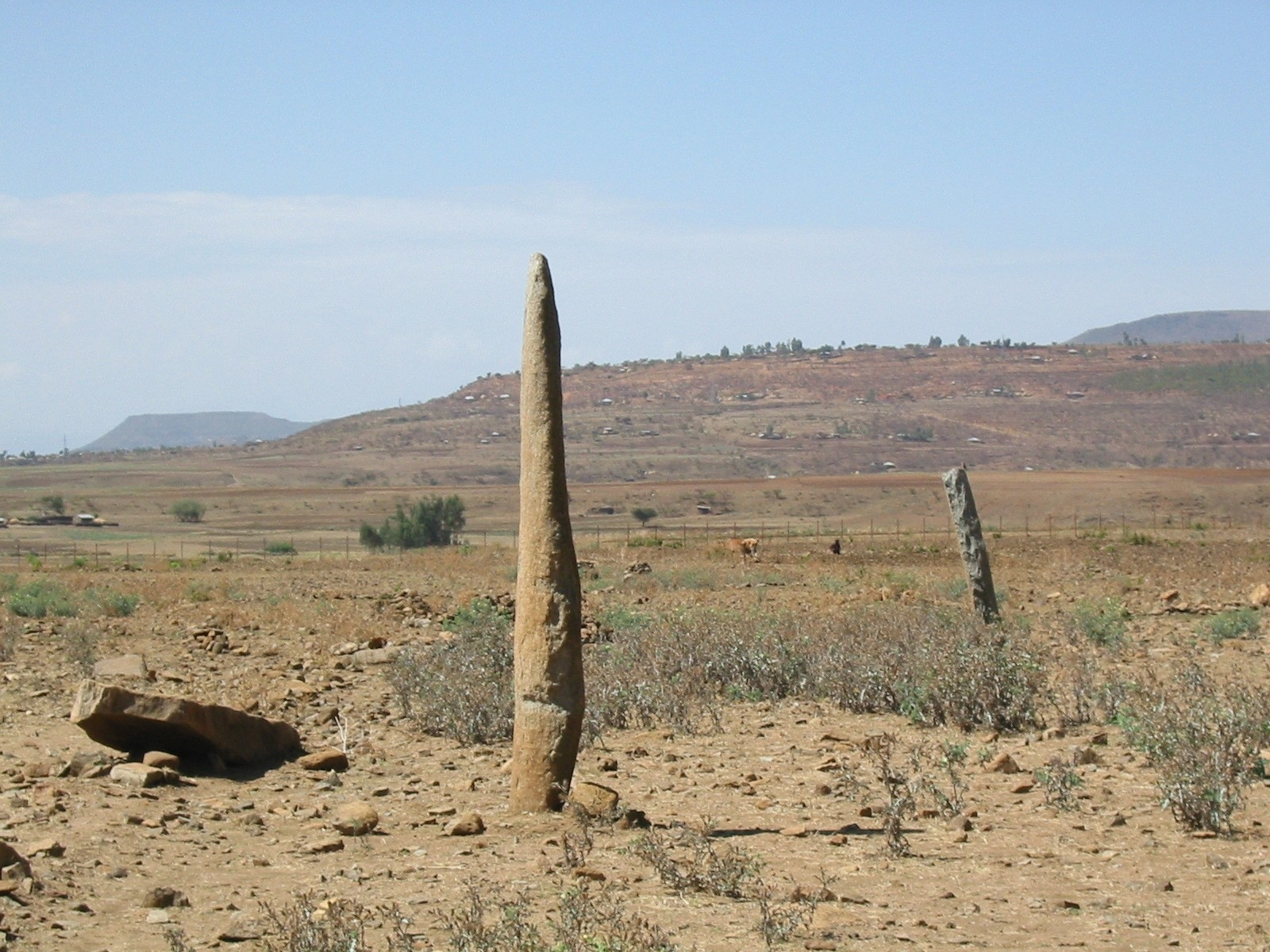
Axum stele in a farmer's field

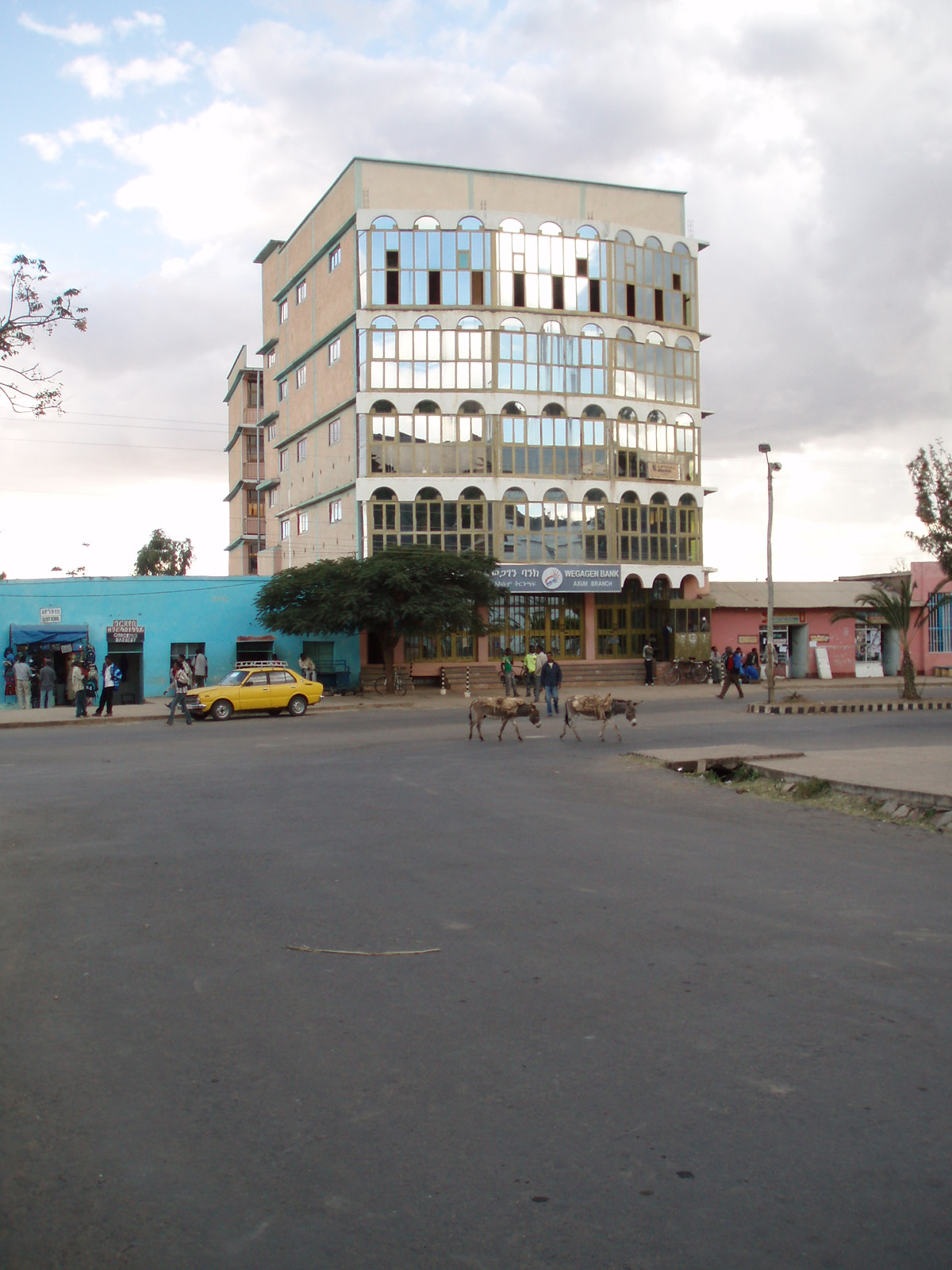
Street in Axum

== See also ==
- List of megalithic sites
- List of World Heritage Sites in Ethiopia
