= Daniel Krencker =

Alsatian-German architectural historian

Daniel Krencker (15 July 1874, Andolsheim – 10 November 1941, Berlin) was an Alsatian-German architectural historian. He is known for his studies of Roman architecture, in particular, his investigations of its temples (Asia Minor, Syria) and thermal baths.

From 1894 to 1898 he studied architecture at the Technische Hochshule at Berlin-Charlottenburg. Later on, he served as a professor of architectural history at the university. (from 1922 to 1941). Concurrently, he was an honorary professor of Geschichte der Bau- und Gartenkunst at the agricultural university in Berlin (1930–1941).

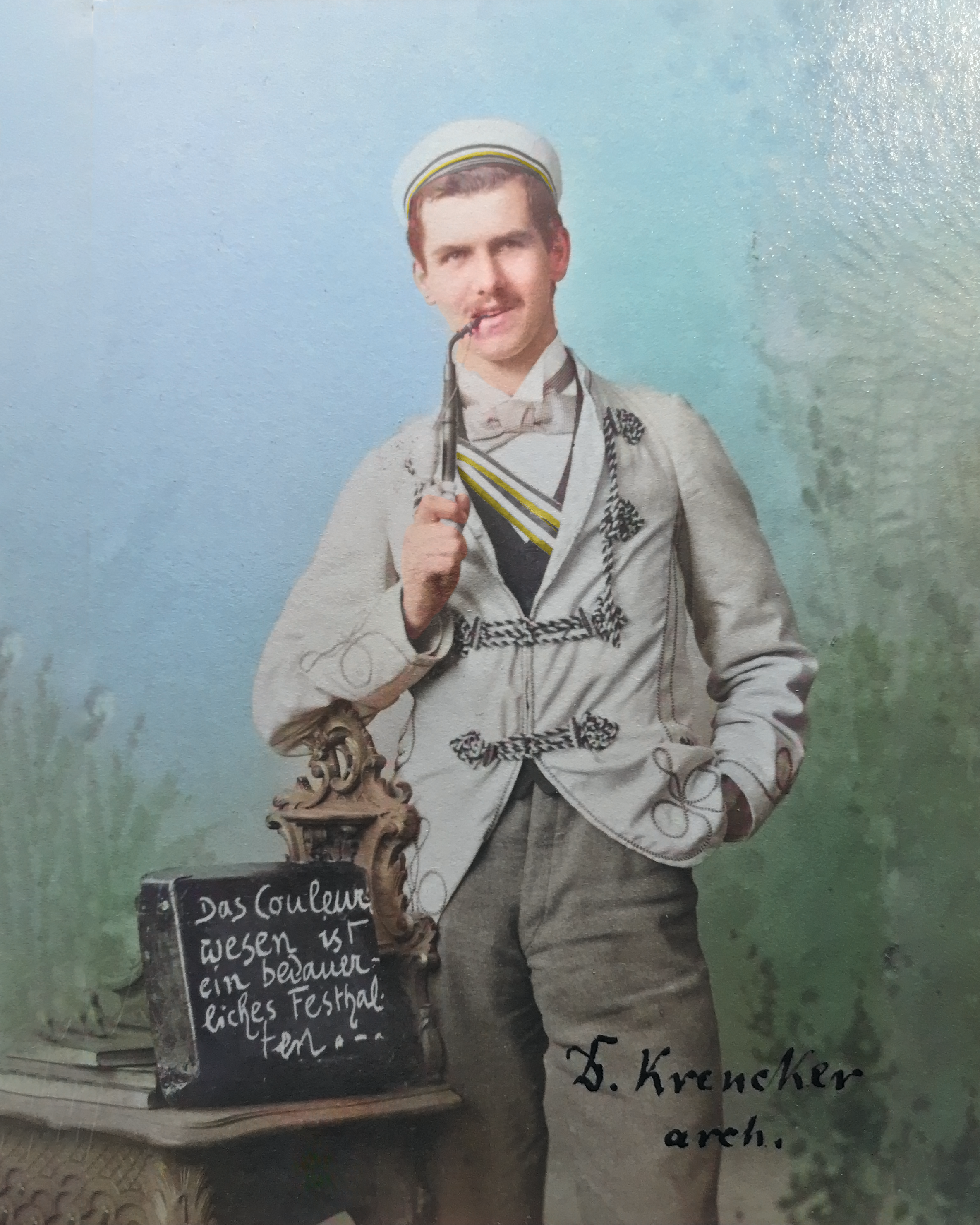
Daniel Krencker in 1894

Under the direction of Otto Puchstein and Bruno Schulz (1865–1932), from 1900 to 1904, he investigated the ancient Roman ruins at Baalbek and Palmyra. In 1905/06 he was technical manager of an expedition to Aksum (Abyssinia). Later on, he conducted studies at the excavation site of the Hittite capital of Hattusa (Asia Minor, 1907).

In 1912 he was appointed head of the architecture department in Quedlinburg, and subsequently put in charge of excavation of the Trier Imperial Baths. He later returned to Asia Minor, where he conducted significant research of the temples at Ankara ("Temple of Augustus and Rome") and Aizanoi. In 1939 he made one last trip to Syria, where he investigated the Monumentalanlage at the Church of Simeon Stylites.

== Published works ==
- Boghasköi, die Bauwerke, 1912 (by Otto Puchstein, with assistance from Krencker and Heinrich Kohl – Hattusa, its construction.
- Ältere Denkmäler Nordabessiniens, 1913 with Theodor von Lüpke (1873–1961) – Ancient monuments of northern Abyssinia.
- Baalbek 2. Band Ergebnisse der Ausgrabungen und Untersuchungen in den Jahren 1898 bis 1905; edited by Theodor Wiegand, Daniel Krencker, Theodor von Lüpke and Hermann Winnefeld (1862–1918) with assistance from Otto Puchstein and Bruno Schulz – Baalbek (Volume 2) Results of excavations and investigations in the years 1898-1905.
- Der Zeustempel zu Aizanoi: nach den Ausgrabungen von Daniel Krencker und Martin Schede – The Temple of Zeus at Aizanoi, according to the excavation by Krencker and Martin Schede (1883–1947).
- Die Trierer Kaiserthermen, 1929 – The Trier Imperial thermal baths.
- Palmyra : Ergebnisse der Expeditionen von 1902 und 1917, with Theodor Wiegand, 1932 – Palmyra, results of 1902 and 1917 expeditions.
- Römische Tempel in Syrien: nach Aufnahmen und Untersuchungen von Mitgliedern der Deutschen Baalbekexpedition 1901-1904; with Otto Puchstein and Bruno Schulz, 1933 – A Roman temple in Syria; records and investigations by members of the German "Baalbekexpedition" 1901-1904.
- Römische Tempel in Syrien, with Willy Zschietzschmann (1900–1976), 1938.
- Der Tempel in Ankara, with Martin Schede and others, 1936 – The temple at Ankara.
