= Enno Littmann =

German orientalist (1875–1958)

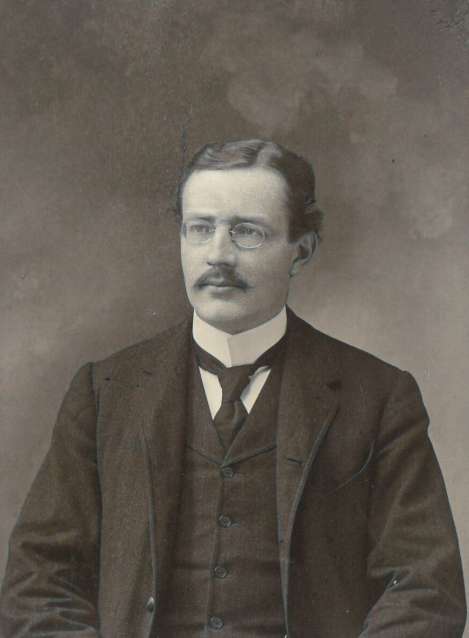
Littman in 1903

Ludwig Richard Enno Littmann (16 September 1875, Oldenburg – 4 May 1958, Tübingen) was a German orientalist. In 1906, he succeeded Theodor Nöldeke as chair of Oriental languages at the University of Strasbourg. Later on, he served as a professor of Oriental languages at the Universities of Göttingen (1914–16), Bonn (1918–21) and Tübingen (1921–49).

In 1901, he successfully deciphered the Safaitic script. He went on to decipher and annotate Palmyrene, Nabataean and Syriac inscriptions as well as historical texts of ancient Ethiopian monuments. In 1905 he stayed among the Tigre people in Eritrea, and during the following year, directed the German Aksum-Expedition in Ethiopia. He published a translation of One Thousand and One Nights from Arabic into German, "Erzählungen aus den Tausendundein Nächten" (6 volumes, 1921–28, 3 1954).

== Works ==
- 1897: "Die Pronomina in Tigré", in: Zeitschrift für Assyriologie 12, pp. 188–230, 291–316.
- 1898: "Das Verbum der Tigre-Sprache", in: Zeitschrift für Assyrologie 13, pp. 133–178; 14, pp. 1–102.
- 1902: (ed.) Debtera Zaneb, The chronicle of King Theodore of Abyssinia. Princeton University Library.
- 1904: Philosophi abessini. (Corpus Scriptorum Christianorum Orientalium, 18–19; Scriptores Aetiopici, 1–2)
- 1904: Semitic Inscriptions. New York: The Century Co. (online version at the Internet Archive)
- 1905: Modern Arabic tales. – Vol. 1: Arabic Text. Leyden: Brill. (online version at the Internet Archive)
- 1910–15: Publications of the Princeton expedition to Abyssinia, 4 vols. Leyden: E. J. Brill.
- 1935: Abessinien. Hamburg: Hanseatische Verlagsanstalt.
- 1962: (with: Höfner, M.) Wörterbuch der Tigrē-Sprache: Tigrē-Deutsch-Englisch. Wiesbaden: Franz Steiner Verlag.

== Sources ==
- Biesterfeldt, H. H. (1986). "Enno Littmann: Leben und Arbeit. Ein autobiographisches Fragment (1875–1904)", in: Oriens 29, pp. 1–101.
- Ullendorff, E. (1958). Obituary of Enno Littmann, in: Africa 28, p. 364.
- Ullendorff, E. (24 May 1958). Obituary of Enno Littmann, in: The Times.
