= Bruno Schulz (architect) =

German architectural historian

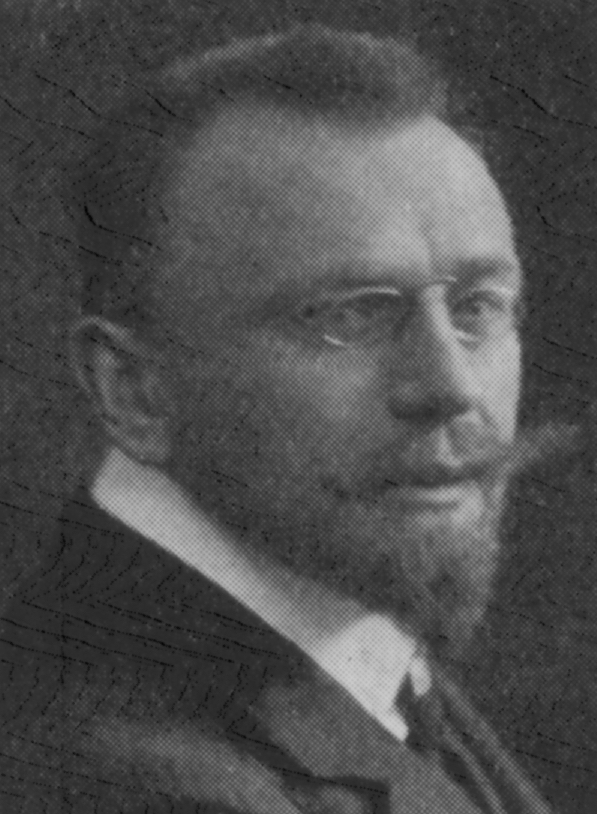

Bruno Schulz (24 February 1865, in Friedeberg – 1 April 1932, in Berlin) was a German architectural historian.

From 1893 onward, he was employed as a Regierungsbaumeister (government architect) in Berlin. In 1897-98, he accompanied Friedrich Sarre on a research trip to Persia, and after his return to Europe, lived and worked in Venice during the years 1899–1900. He then served as technical director of the German archaeological excavation at Baalbek (1900–1904). Later on, he taught classes on the morphology of classical and Renaissance architecture at Technische Hochschule Hannover (today Leibniz University Hannover), and in 1912 was appointed professor of architecture at Technische Hochschule Berlin (today Technische Universität Berlin).

== Published works ==
- Das Grabmal des Theoderich zu Ravenna und seine Stellung in der Architekturgeschichte, 1911 – The tomb of Theodoric at Ravenna and its place in architectural history.
- Ardabil : Grabmoschee des Schech Safi, 1924 (main author, Friedrich Sarre) – Ardabil, The grave-mosque of Sheikh Safi.
- Die Kirchenbauten auf der Insel Torcello aufgenommen, 1927 – The churches on the island of Torcello.
- Römische Tempel in Syrien, nach Aufnahmen und Untersuchungen von Mitgliedern der Deutschen Baalbekexpedition 1901-1904, (with Otto Puchstein, Daniel Krencker) – Roman temple in Syria; Recordings and studies by members of the German Baalbek Expedition.
