= Otto Puchstein =

German classical archaeologist (1856–1911)

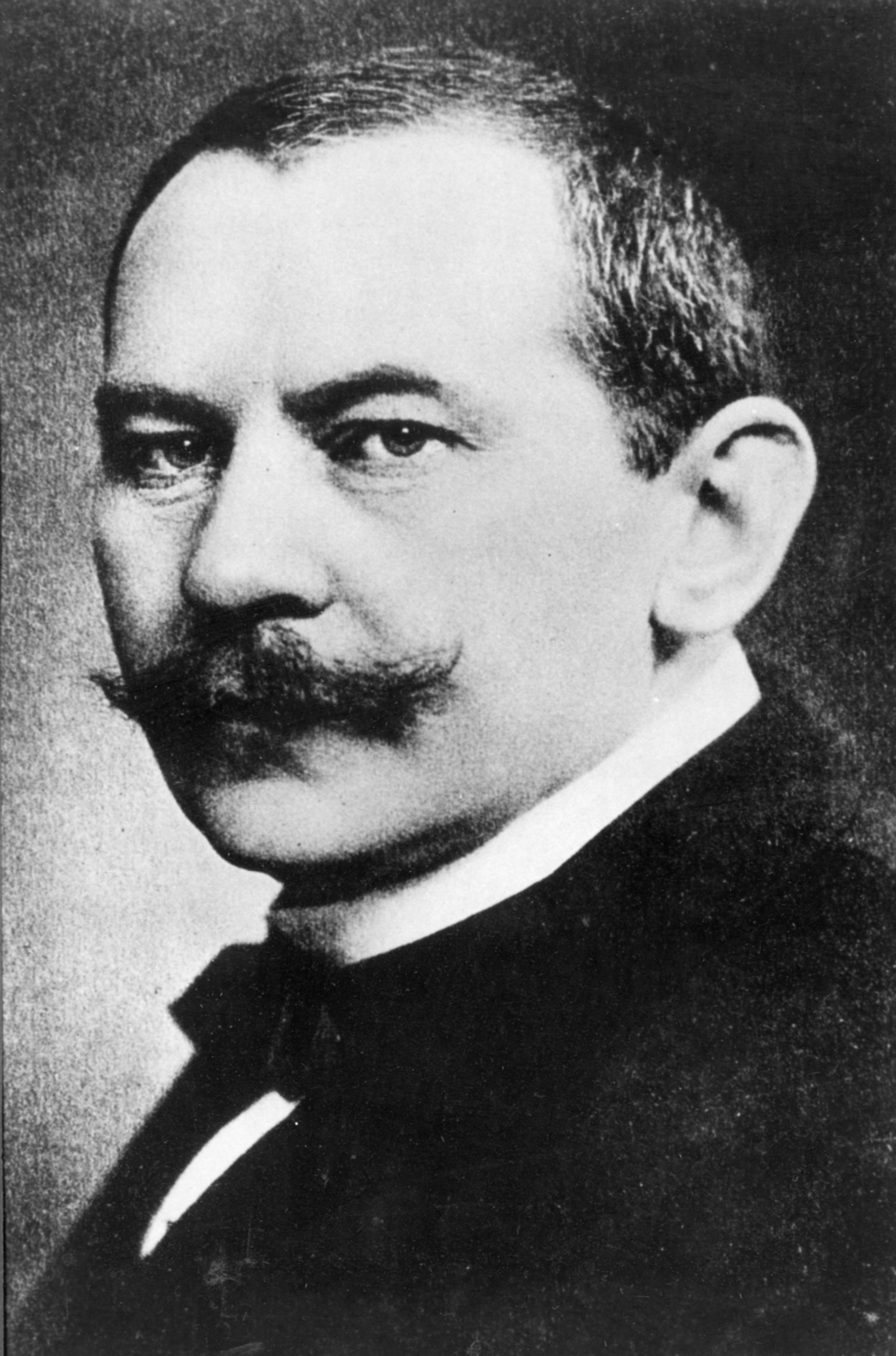
- Born: 6 July 1856; Łobez, Kingdom of Prussia
- Died: 9 March 1911 (aged 54); Berlin, Kingdom of Prussia, German Empire
- Education: University of Strasbourg
- Scientific career
- Fields: Archeology
- Workplaces: University of Freiburg

Otto Puchstein (6 July 1856, Labes – 9 March 1911, Berlin) was a German classical archaeologist.

From 1875 to 1879 he studied philology, classical archaeology and Egyptology at the University of Strasbourg, where his instructors included Adolf Michaelis, Rudolf Schöll and Johannes Dümichen. Later on, via a grant from the German Archaeological Institute (DAI), he conducted studies of ancient sculptures in Alexandria and Cairo (1881–1883). In 1883, on behalf of the Prussian Academy of Sciences, with Carl Humann and Felix von Luschan, he took part in an expedition to Nemrud Dagi, where he visited the tomb of Antiochus I Theos of Commagene.

In 1889 he received his habilitation in Berlin. With Robert Koldewey, he conducted research of Greek temples in southern Italy and Sicily (1892 & 1893/94), and in 1895, investigated the ancient walled city of Paestum (southern Italy). During the following year, he succeeded Franz Studniczka as chair of classical archaeology at the University of Freiburg (1896). In 1900 he undertook an expedition to Baalbek, and in 1907, with Ludwig Curtius and others, travelled to the excavation site of the Hittite capital of Hattusa. In 1910 he took a trip to North Africa in order to study the Roman cities of Lambaesis and Timgad.

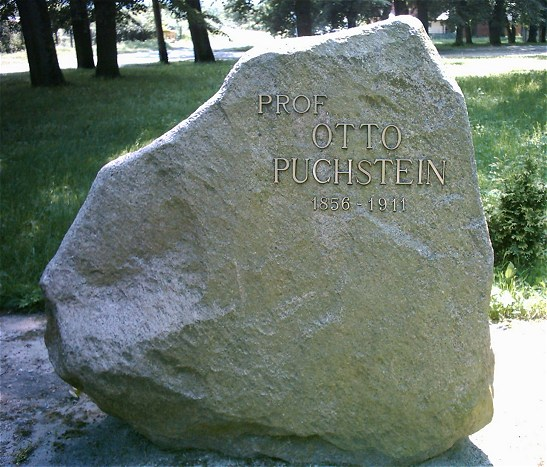
Gedenkstein of Puchstein in Łobez

== Published works ==
- Epigrammata Graeca in Aegypto reperta, dissertation, Straßburg 1880.
- Beschreibung der Skulpturen aus Pergamon. Volume 1 Königliche Museen, Berlin, second edition 1902.
- Die Tempel auf Ortygia, Berlin 1898.
- Die griechischen Tempel in Unteritalien und Sicilien. 1. Band Text, 2. Band Tafeln. Asher, Berlin, 1899 (with Robert Koldewey).
- Die griechische Bühne, eine architektonische Untersuchung. Berlin 1901.
- Führer durch die Ruinen von Baalbek. 39 S., G. Reimer, Berlin 1905.
- Die ionische Säule als klassisches Bauglied orientalischer Herkunft. Ein Vortrag. Leipzig 1907.
