= Ernst Boetticher =

Prussian soldier, journalist, and opponent of Heinrich Schliemann

- Born: 30 July 1842; Düsseldorf
- Died: 1 February 1930 (aged 87); Blankenburg (Harz)
- Military career
- Service years: 1860–1876
- Rank: Hauptmann
- Conflicts: Austro-Prussian War; Franco-Prussian War

Ernst Boetticher (German: Ernst Carl August Christian Richard Boetticher; (Note: The second name and surname had the spelling form Carl Boetticher during his lifetime; the variants “Karl” and “Bötticher” were used much less frequently.) 30 July 1842 – 1 February 1930) was a Prussian Army soldier and journalist, best known as Heinrich Schliemann’s opponent.

He began his military career at the age of 18 and took part in the Austro-Prussian and Franco-Prussian wars, where he was awarded the Iron Cross, Second Class. He retired in 1876 in the rank of captain. He studied at the University of Berlin, passing through several specialities (politics, political economy, history, philosophy). Interested in archaeology, he was elected a member of the Berlin Archaeological Society in 1885, from which he was expelled in 1889. After his resignation, his main occupation was journalism.

In the early 1880s, Boetticher published a series of articles on archaeology, ethnography and politics. He gained scandalous fame with articles arguing that Schliemann's findings at Troy represented a "fire necropolis" rather than an ancient city proper. The active position of the retired officer led to the organisation of two Troy conferences (December 1889 and March 1890), whose participants signed a protocol confirming that the ancient cities excavated by Schliemann were successive settlements. After Schliemann's death, Boetticher continued to publish articles and books in defence of Schliemann's ideas until at least 1911, earning him the reputation of a "mad scientist".

Boetticher's academic biography was only published in 2009. German historiography of the 21st century compares the strategies of self-promotion and promotion of one's theories developed by Schliemann and Boetticher, both of whom are considered dilettantes in archaeology. For Heinrich Schliemann, however, self-aggrandisement through public opinion and the media was necessary to achieve academic recognition and a career change from merchant to scholar-archaeologist. He took the advice of highly professional scientists and specialists such as Rudolf Virchow and Wilhelm Dörpfeld and actively learned from them. Boetticher was never able to cross the line separating the scientist from the dilettante, he was unable to accept criticism, which led him to promote "conspiracy theories" and into oblivion.

== Biography ==
=== Military career ===
Schliemann's life is well documented, but there is little information about Boetticher. Also, many archives with information were lost during World War II. Ernst Boetticher was born on 30 July 1842 in Düsseldorf to Johann August Wilhelm and Wilhelmina Johanna Elisabeth Schulz. Ernst had a brother, Hermann, but there is no information about him. His father was a printer and publisher. In 1853 he became burgomaster of Otweiler. In 1860, he was appointed district mayor of Sigmaringen and died the same year. In 1860, Ernst Boetticher graduated from the Düsseldorf Gymnasium and joined the army. In 1861-1864, he studied at the Berlin Joint Artillery and Engineering School. In 1862, he was promoted to junior lieutenant and assigned to a howitzer battery of the Eighth Artillery Brigade stationed in Jülich. After it was disbanded, Boetticher was transferred to Cologne to a Second Infantry Brigade battery. This battery fought in the Austro-Prussian War, including at the Battle of Königgrätz on 3 July 1866. On 12 September, his unit returned to Cologne. In winter 1867-68, he moved to Koblenz as adjutant to the Third Infantry Regiment commander. In 1869, he was transferred to Cologne, promoted to senior lieutenant and assigned to the infantry section of the Rhine Artillery Regiment.

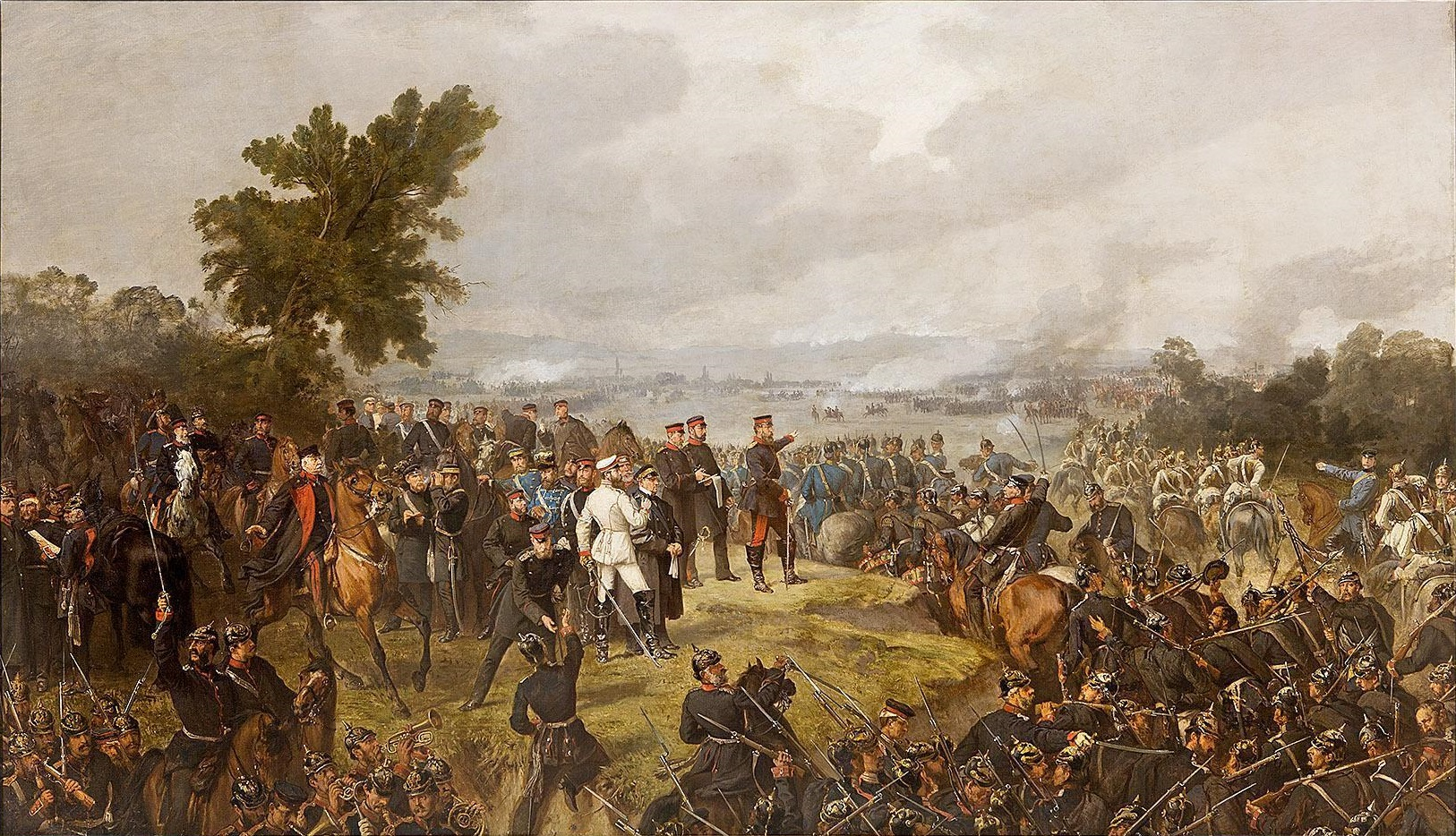
Otto Heyden. The Silesian Army on the morning of the battle of Königretz, July 3, 1866. 1870, canvas, oil. 165 × 283 cm

Little is known about Boetticher's service in the Franco-Prussian War. His regiment was used in two different parts of the war: one fought in northern France, the other supported the siege artillery. Ernst was probably in the siege battery. In late September 1870, he was listed as a member of Captain Kaulbach's fourth company. On October 17, he arrived in Paris with his fellow soldiers. There is a gap in his service record. On 6 January 1871, he replaced the wounded Captain Richard Hoffmann von Waldau, commander of the sixth company of the siege artillery regiment of the Guards. On 27 January, Ernst Boetticher was awarded the second-class Iron Cross. 510 men were honoured with this award during the war. There is no evidence, that Ernst Boetticher was awarded other medals. He also marched in the victory parade before the heir to the throne. Boetticher was transferred to the Rhine Fortress Artillery Regiment in 1873. In 1874, he was promoted to Hauptmann and became a company commander. In 1876, Ernst Boetticher retired from the military. We don't know why he retired because the Prussian military archives were destroyed in 1945.

=== Journalist ===
After Boetticher resigned, there is no proof of where he was until 1881. He probably settled in the capital in 1880 and made several trips to museums in Kassel, Weimar, Gotha, Leipzig, Dresden, Breslau, Nuremberg and Munich. In 1881, he was studying at the University of Berlin, getting top marks in politics, history, economics and philosophy. On 20 June 1885, Boettischer became a full member of the Berlin Archaeological Society. He remained a member until 1 November 1889. From his letters, we can see that Ernst Boetticher was educated and spoke English, French and Italian. He knew classical languages well.

In the 1880s, Ernst Boetticher started writing for newspapers under the name Otto von Weiler. In 1882, he became interested in interpreting Schliemann's excavations at Hissarlik. In 1883, he published an article in the Zeitschrift für Ethnologie about a type of funerary vessel with images of human and animal faces. In January 1884, Boetticher became editor of the Mixture department in the Zeitschrift für Museologie und Antiquitätenkunde. After the death of the chief editor, Johann-Georg Gresse, he took over the publication. The journal closed on 31 December 1885. Boetticher had a bad reputation because of his conflict with Rudolf Virchow. In 1889 he was expelled from the Berlin Archaeological Society. Extant correspondence from 1884-1888 between Boetticher and the editors of some journals, especially the ethnographic Das Auslands, indicates that many of his manuscripts (including articles on German gods and heroes) were rejected and returned to the author.

As evidenced in his address books, Boettcher resided in Munich between the summer of 1887 and the fall of 1889, residing at No. 21 Maximilianstrasse. His extensive bibliography from this period encompasses a diverse range of subjects, including Fayum portraits and reviews of modern painting exhibitions. In the field of archaeology, he gained notoriety for his controversial theory regarding unglazed pottery. Boetticher posited that such vessels were not functional and were instead late imitations, unsuitable for everyday use. This resulted in some contention regarding the donation of nine vessels to the Bavarian National Museum. In contemporary catalogues, they are designated as "Old Germanic”.

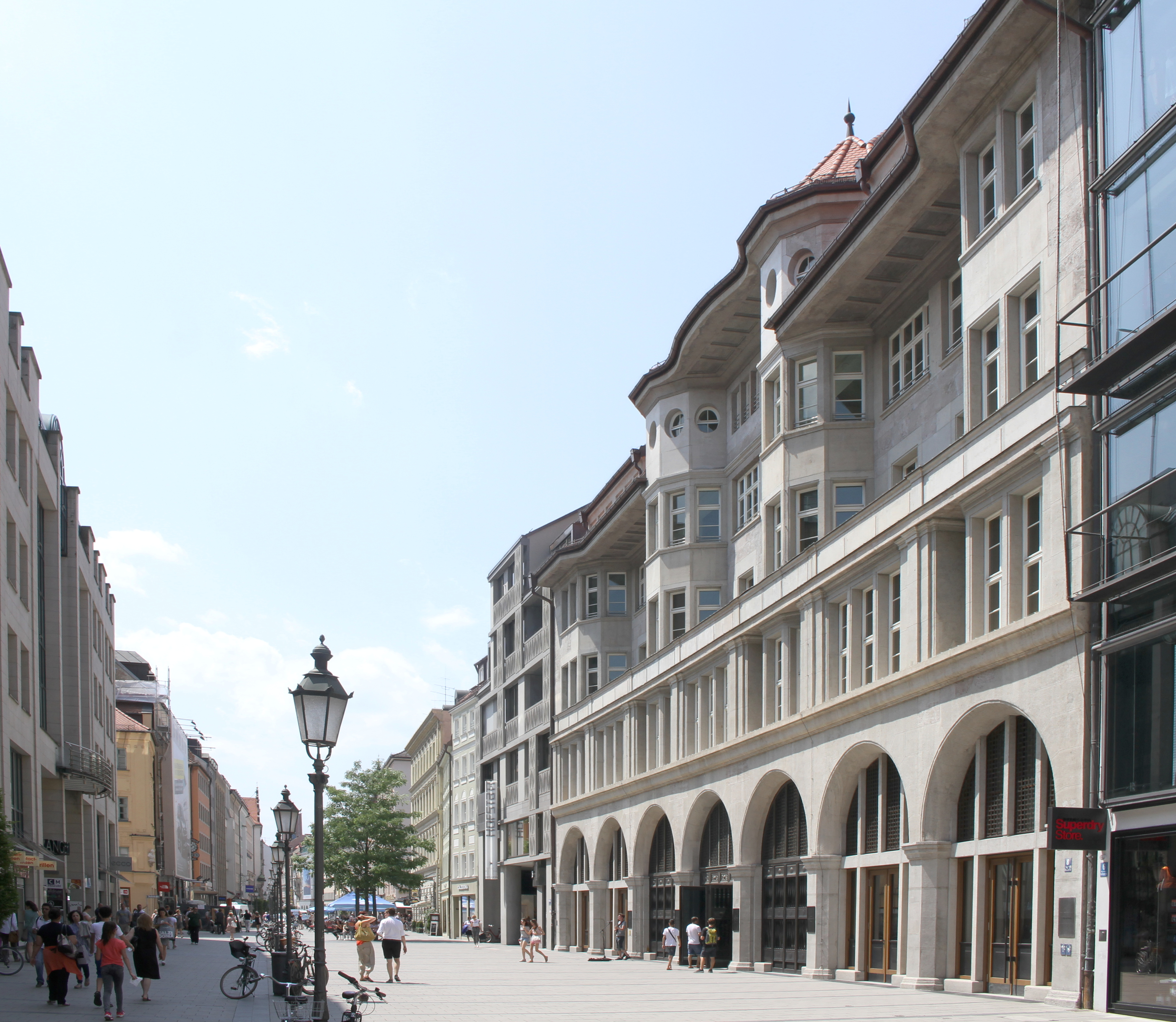
The Münchner Neueste Nachrichten newspaper office building on Sendlinger Tor in Munich

By the time he was based in Munich, Ernst Boetticher had become a member of the Association of German Writers. Documents from April 1889 have been preserved, which indicate that an inquiry was made to the Association to confirm Boetticher's pension payment. The correspondence with Schliemann and Dörpfeld was conducted through the editors of the newspaper Münchner Neueste Nachrichten. The inaugural Hissarlık Conference was convened between December 1-6, 1889, in Troas. Thereafter, Boetticher relocated to Berlin, as evidenced by the correspondence dated March 1-3, 1890. The management of the Berlin Royal Library declined to lend books to the retired Hauptmann and demanded references. In response, Boetticher asserted that his publications in the fields of culture, archaeology, and art history provided sufficient publicity. Furthermore, surviving correspondence with the Austrian archaeologist Otto Benndorf mentioned, that Boetticher was engaged with Trojan archaeological questions that were distinct from his polemics with Schliemann. In 1892, Otto Crusius refuted Boetticher's article on the geographical locations of Troy and Thymbra. This is evidenced by a letter from the author thanking Crusius for his comprehensive analysis of the errors in the article. In 1896, as evidenced by correspondence, Boetticher visited his army friend in Potsdam and exchanged angry letters with the Berlin library authorities, who charged him a penalty for a four-month overdue subscription, as the maximum period for using a book did not exceed two months. In the same year, Boetticher published an article in the Münchner Neueste Nachrichten in which he advocated the resumption of gold mining in the ancient deposits of Thasos. In 1896, he was employed as the editor of the daily newspaper Hamburger Nachrichten, a position he held until at least 1903.

On April 26, 1898, Ernst Boetticher got married with Anna Martha Widmann, who was born in 1866. Her father, the poet Christian Widmann, had by that time already passed away. Anna and her mother Charlotte were neighbors of the journalist. According to the available evidence, the Boetticher couple resided in Berlin until the spring of 1914. Ernst's mother-in-law is known to have died no later than 1900. The head of the family continued to pursue a career in journalism, as evidenced by the few surviving letters, which suggest that his interests remained consistent. In the spring of 1914, the couple relocated to Blankenburg in Harz. Ernst Boetticher sent the last surviving letter to Ulrich von Wilamowitz-Möllendorff in June from this new residence. Subsequently, likely due to age-related changes, Boetticher ceased engaging in intellectual pursuits. The last decade and a half of his life remains largely uncharted. He died on February 1, 1930, in a hospital in Blankenburg, as a result of a stroke, at the age of 87. On February 5, hisremains were cremated in Quedlinburg, and the urn with his ashes was interred in the Blankenburg City Cemetery. Anna Boetticher departed from Blankenburg in 1933, and her ultimate fate remains uncertain. In April 1945, retreating Nazi troops burned the town archives, which has made it difficult to ascertain her whereabouts and circumstances.

== Dispute with Heinrich Schliemann ==
=== The first period (1883—1887) ===
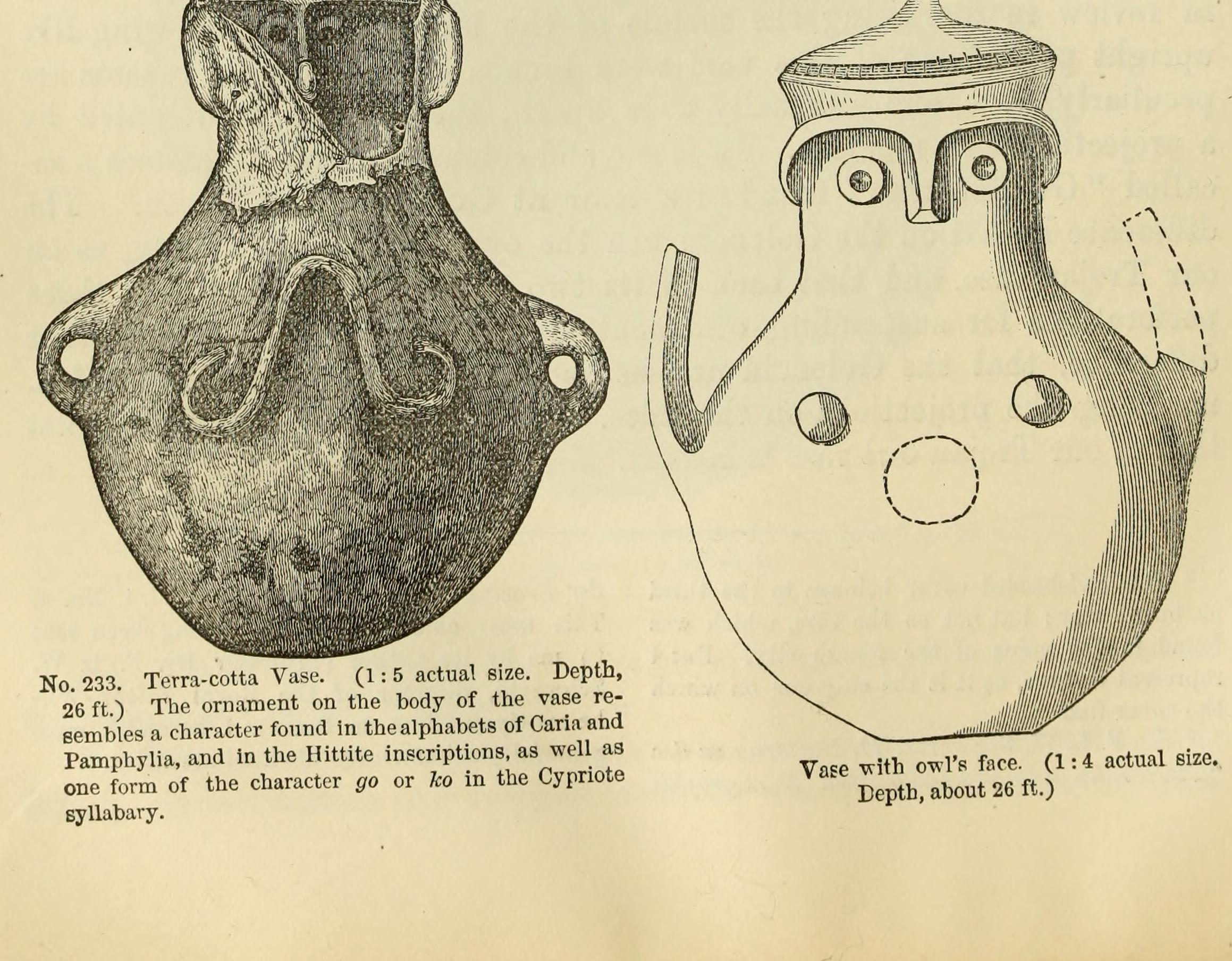
Archaeological illustrations from G. Schliemann's book Ilion. On the right is a drawing of a front vase with an owl on it

In 1882, Heinrich Schliemann published a book called Ilion. Boetticher noted in his review that Émile-Louis Burnouf's plans made for Schliemann showed doorless cells connected by a corridor. Boetticher compared this information with the description of a thick layer of wood ash and multiple findings of urns containing human ashes without bones. He believed this was evidence of cremation by Homer. He concluded that this was not a Homeric city, but a "fire necropolis" — a cult center in which the cremation of all the dead in the region of Troas took place. Ernst Boetticher compared it to his modern Siemens' crematorium in Gotha. The bones were completely burned, producing ashes. The journalist also argued that the finds did not contain any texts and that the objects interpreted by Schliemann and his collaborators as household items were too crudely executed to be used in everyday life. Schliemann didn't link the Pythian graves to burial rites. Boetticher linked the kitchen piles to his theory because he assumed the ancient Trojans would not have kitchen garbage at home. He said there were no layers of artifacts at Hissarlik. He also said the city Schliemann found was small and there was no proof of walls. Boetticher thought the city Schliemann found didn't have a "settlement". Boetticher criticized Schliemann and Dörpfeld's archaeological plans and illustrations, calling them falsifications. M. Zavadil noticed that Boetticher's first publication on the functions of "face urns" with the image of an owl was noticed by Schliemann. This is evidenced by a letter to Virchow dated November 29, 1883. We don't know why Boetticher chose to criticize Schliemann's book Ilion instead of his earlier publications. Zavadil suggests that Boetticher may have gotten the idea of a necropolis from W. Loftus's description of the Uruk excavations.

Boetticher's letters tell us when he started making movies about Troy and what people thought of them. In November 1882, the retired Hauptmann sent a review of Schliemann's excavations to Karl von Cotta. It was rejected because it was about a topic that not many people would be interested in. Bötticher then asked D. Collin, who owned the bookstore I. Guttentag, to get reviews of Anti-Ilion. Collin got reviews from E. Hübner and C. Belger. Dörpfeld probably read the manuscript too. He was in Berlin at the time. Most of them did not recommend the article for publication. Belger noted that the author's lack of expertise undermined the argument. The article was published after Schliemann's main critic, Emil Brentano, agreed to review it.

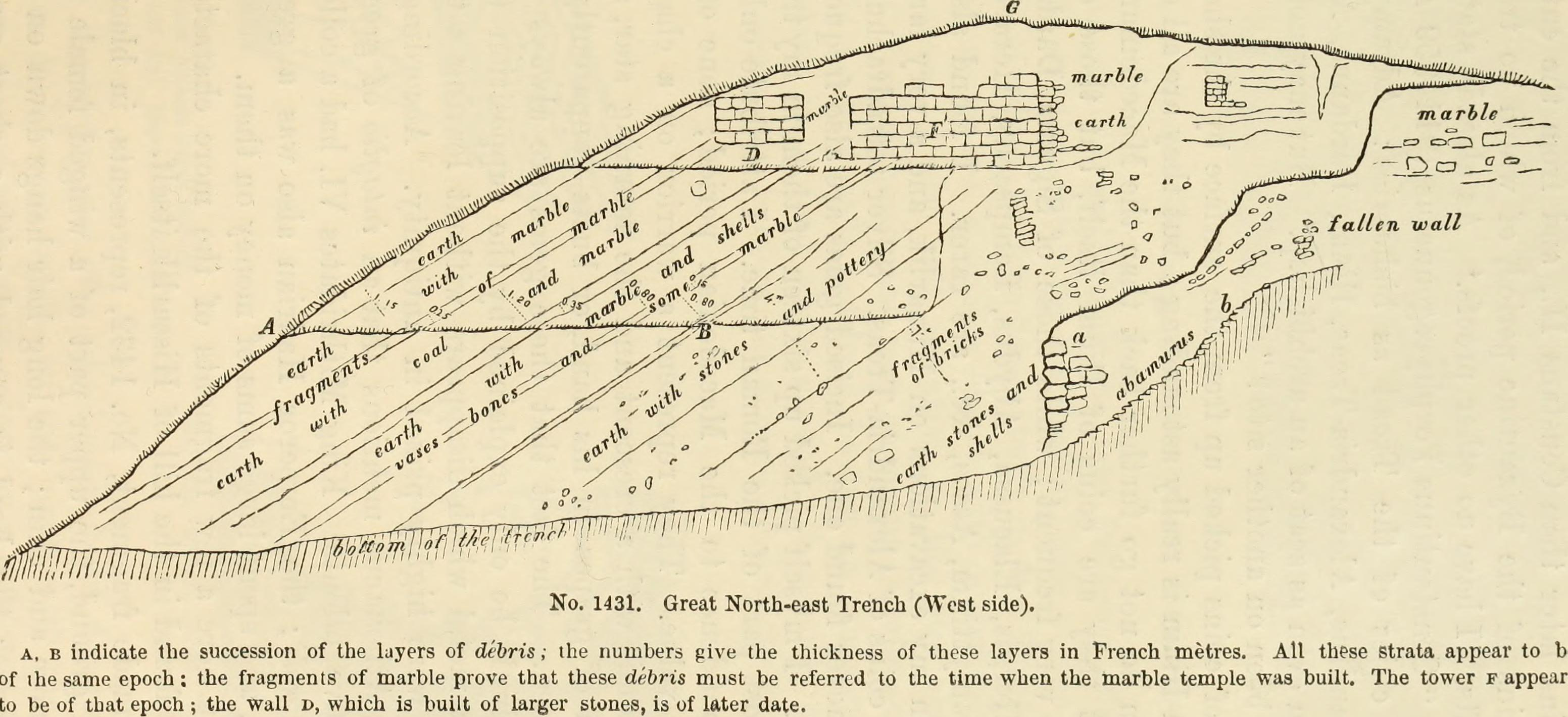
Stratigraphy of the Troy hill. Scheme of 1882 from the book Ilion

On January 22, 1884, Schliemann wrote a long letter to Rudolf Virchow because he was disturbed by Boetticher's interpretations. He called them "insane" and listed 17 errors. On January 31, Virchow replied that the publication was fine and that the Hauptmann was right in some ways. Schliemann's publisher, Brockhaus, told him on February 20 that they wouldn't accept manuscripts from Boetticher. They thought he was overdramatic. On February 16, 1884, R. Virchow read a report at a meeting of the Berlin Anthropological Society. He refuted all of Bötticher's arguments about Troy as a fiery necropolis. Ernst replied to him in the Kölnische Zeitung at the beginning of March. Schliemann only heard about the ongoing debate in June because he was busy with the Tirynthos excavations. In the fall of 1884, W. Dörpfeld wrote a new answer for Schliemann, which was printed in two newspapers. Boetticher was right that the walls of the "second city" were made of burned brick. Schliemann also gave a talk at the German Anthropological Society meeting in Breslau on August 6, 1884. He discussed the Tiryns excavations and compared them to the Troy findings. He didn't mention Boetticher's name, but his report was full of references to him. Ernst Boetticher published two more articles. He said the findings at Tirynthos were from a fire necropolis. He said there was no proof it was a settlement.

Boetticher's activism broadened the scope of the polemic. In early 1885, a review of the arguments of Schliemann and his opponent was published in the Revue Archéologique. The author, S. Reinach, said he had no reason to doubt Boetticher's work. L. Klein wrote that the scientific world supported Boetticher's argument because of Schliemann's self-promotion and doubts about his competence. At the German Anthropological Society meeting in Karlsruhe (August 6-9, 1885), Schliemann read a paper on the Tirynthos citadel excavation. Boetticher said the big blocks found by Dörpfeld and Schliemann were like the blocks that blocked the entrances to Egyptian pyramids. Ernst Boetticher then said that the unglazed pithos found at Hissarlik and Tiryns could have been used for storing wine and olive oil. Schliemann asked Ernst Fabricius to test the tightness of ancient pithoi by pouring water into them, but Fabricius refused to get involved in the argument. Like Virchow, he told Schliemann that professionals could not take Boetticher's theories seriously.

=== Second period: the Hissarlik Conferences of 1889-1890 ===
==== Background: Congresses in Vienna and Paris ====
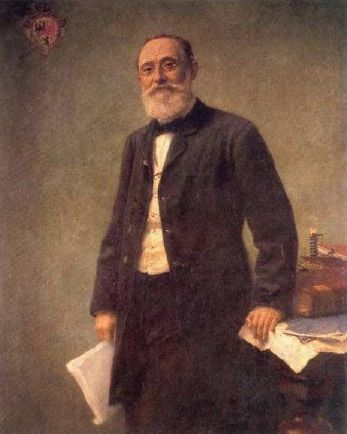
Hugo Vogel. Portrait of Rudolf Virchow

In Schliemann's correspondence, the topic of Boetticher's theories was revisited in March 1889, coinciding with the preparations for the inauguration of the Natural History Museum of Vienna (which took place on August 10). The ceremony was to be presided over by R. Virchow, and the anticipated presence of the "eternally angry" Boetticher as a correspondent was expected, given that the opening was timed to coincide with a congress of archaeologists and anthropologists. Schliemann was extended an official invitation on May 26, 1889, but ultimately did not attend the conference. By that time, he was compelled to relinquish the notion of undertaking research in Crete, while Boetticher continued to advocate for the establishment of an international, independent commission to reexamine the excavations at Troy. He based his demand on his concept of obliterating the evidence of the fire necropolis unearthed by Schliemann and Dörpfeld. In private correspondence, Schliemann referred to these ideas as "horrible abominations" and "arrogant nonsense," expressing resentment toward Boettischer's activities, given that he had never been to the East and had not engaged in field research. In June 1889, as a result of Virchow's intervention, Boetticher published an article in which he demonstrated, based on the excavations conducted by Koldewey, that fire necropolises existed in Babylonia. This finding significantly undermined Schliemann's position. The subject was the 1886-1887 expedition of the Royal Prussian Museums to Mesopotamia (in what is now southeastern Iraq). In the Zeitschrift für Assyriologie, Koldewey printed a report on the excavations in which Boetticher found confirmation of his theory of a fiery necropolis: narrow streets and continuous passages, terraces surrounded by small rooms, and vessels resembling ancient pithos were found. M. Zavadil noted that new interpretations of the finds and photographs showed that Koldewey had discovered temple terraces of the usual Babylonian type; the pithos were used for sacrificial burials inside the dwellings, also standard for Near Eastern civilizations. Boetticher himself wrote a letter of thanks to Caldeway (July 27, 1888) in which he stated that Caldeway had fully confirmed (minus the priority of the discovery of the "fire necropolises") what Ernst himself had "seen with a spiritual eye in the finds from Hissarlık". Caldeway immediately sent a note to the journal dissociating himself from the fire necropolis theory and explaining that he had used this combination of words in a technical sense. He did not correspond directly with Boetticher again. The journalist tried to contact him through Georg Ebers, with whom they apparently knew each other through the Munich Writers' Association.

In 1889 Boetticher published the first part of a large article proving the existence of fiery necropolises in Troas and Babylonia (the second part never saw the light of day). The French publication was preceded by a preface by the Belgian Orientalist de Arlez, as the German publishers refused to print it. He sent a copy of the article to Hamdi Bey, director of the Ottoman Museum, insisting on excavations at Hissarlik independent of Schliemann. Finally, even Virchow, who strove for maximum diversity of opinion, lost patience and publicly criticized Boetticher's theories at the Vienna Archaeological Congress. In response, the Hauptmann sent the scientist a sharp letter, which the latter did not read and had no further dealings with him. On the advice of Dörpfeld, Schliemann decided to organize an international conference on Gissarlyk and to invite Boetticher himself to convince him of the complete fallacy of his statements. He also undertook to pay the captain's travel expenses. It was Dörpfeld who sent Boetticher a personal invitation, which he duplicated in an article that appeared in the Berliner Nationalzeitung on August 23. Dörpfeld announced that he himself would show all the excavations and explain the lay of the archaeological layers.

On August 19, 1889, the Xth International Congress of Anthropologists, Historians and Ethnographers was opened in Paris with Schliemann in attendance, and Boetticher sent a 150-page manuscript linking the Troy findings to the Pan-Asian ancestor cult. Its current location is unknown. It was an expanded version of a paper rejected the previous year by the editors of the Internationales Archiv für Ethnologie. Schliemann personally announced to the section that Boetticher had been invited to excavate; his theories were not considered at the congress. However, in correspondence with Brockhaus, he expressed the hope that Boetticher would not agree to go, because on the ruins of the real Troy "his imaginary necropolis would evaporate".

==== The First Troy Conference ====
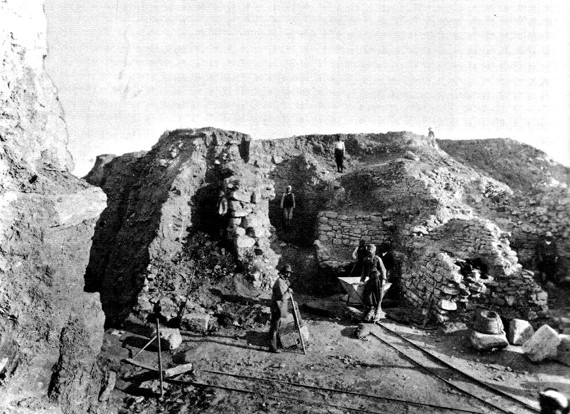
Photo of the summer excavations at Troy in 1890. Dry masonry of ancient buildings and handcarts for transporting rubble along the narrow-gauge railway are clearly visible.

On September 2, 1889, Boetticher received his third invitation to the conference in Troyes, and 1200 marks were allocated for his trip, accompanied by Dörpfeld. Schliemann was somewhat puzzled by Boetticher's request to provide him with a photographic apparatus with accessories, a shovel, a hoe and a pickaxe, since he intended to devote at least eight days to his own excavations. However, the Ottoman Museum did not allow excavations without a special document. On September 12, Dörpfeld and Boetticher met in Munich and from nine in the evening until midnight agreed on the range of topics to be discussed and the conditions of the trip. Dörpfeld was so annoyed that he suggested Schliemann invite a senior artilleryman to the conference to remind Boetticher of his subordination. Preparations for the conference began in October, and the main work was done by the U.S. Honorary Consul Frank Calvert, whose family owned part of Hissarlik. He bought building materials, stored equipment and was involved in the construction of "Schlimanopolis", as some prefabricated guesthouses were ironically called. Since it was possible to obtain a permanent staff for the excavations, Virchow suggested a preliminary reconnaissance to find the sites of real Trojan burials to demonstrate the difference to Boetticher and other guests. Schliemann agreed with Virchow's logic, but did not allow Calvert to dig. Through O. Bönndorf, Schliemann announced that he was calling for supporters of Boetticher's theories to participate in the excavations. The travel expenses would be reimbursed at a rate of 800 marks, and board and lodging for the duration of the conference would be at the organizer's expense. The Austrian Academy decided to send Georg Niemann or Alois Hauser to the conference; Niemann eventually left on the Orient Express. Virchow considered it unethical for him to represent Germany, and Schliemann counted on Major Berngard Steffen, who had experience in excavations at Mycenae, belonged to the same branch of the army as Boetticher, and was senior in rank to him. Steffen was deprived of his salary (which had been increased to 1,000 marks for him), but in return asked for an official leave of absence. The French Academy of Inscriptions and Fine Arts sent Georges Perrot, who was given 1,200 francs for expenses. On his recommendation, the Academy insisted on the candidacy of Charles Babin as more competent in archaeology. Frank Calvert was also among the delegates.

The conference was held from December 1 to 6, 1889. Schliemann was in the Çanakkale from the beginning of November, the work was actually supervised by the tentmaker Yannis Laloudis, renamed Laomendonta. For the needs of the construction, the Societe Decauville Ain & in Evry-Petit-Bourg purchased hand minecarts, two railroad switches and two bar gates, as well as 300 meters of narrow gauge rail. Here Boetticher, who had insisted that the conference be conducted by third parties and not by Dörpfeld or Schliemann, suddenly became indignant. Despite the autumn storms, he arrived at the excavations on November 30, accompanied by Niemann and Steffen; Dörpfeld, who had shown the ruins of Olympia to high-ranking visitors, had managed to arrive three days earlier. The beginning of the conference showed that Boetticher was ignorant of archaeology and confused about terminology. He did not believe that crushed mussel shells had been added to the raw material for adobe bricks, and he was incredulous at Schliemann's explanation that at the beginning of the excavations he had referred to all the vessels found as "urns". Virchow also complained that Schliemann had misused the simple German word Asche or Ashes in his first publications, thus unwittingly misleading Boetticher. On December 4, the delegates dined at Calvert's in Timbre, and during the reception Ernst Bötticher suddenly announced that he would leave the excavation on December 5. He took soil samples and, under pressure from Steffen and Niemann, signed a report stating that what he had seen at the excavation matched the descriptions in Schliemann's articles and books. Boetticher was extremely unhappy with his trip; his own version of events was rejected by scholarly publications and was not published until a book in 1911. Niemann and Steffen gave a press conference in Constantinople on December 10, stating that there had been a human settlement at Troy, not a "fiery necropolis". On December 19, while still in Constantinople, Boetticher issued his own communiqué in which he denied the charge that Dörpfeld had falsified the findings, but expressed dissatisfaction that his own theories had been declared unfounded. In addition, he claimed that his expenses for the trip amounted to 2000 marks and demanded that Schliemann reimburse him for the difference. Schliemann wrote to Virchow that "the scoundrel would not receive a single pfennig" in addition to the thousand already sent to him. Virchow replied that Boetticher's cynicism bordered on insanity and advised him to completely ignore any demands.

==== The Second Troy Conference ====
After receiving congratulations on his victory, Heinrich Schliemann already planned a second conference in mid-December 1889, to be held in March or April of the following year. Virchow gave a series of lectures in Berlin on the results of Schliemann's research, in which he also touched on Boetticher's theories, explaining that they were based on outdated data from Schliemann's 1880 book, and were partly the result of Boetticher's unwillingness to consider criticism and to work with sources in the field. The proceedings of the conference were published in Leipzig in February 1890 in an edition of 125 copies, of which 30 each were given to Niemann, Steffen, and Dörpfeld, and 25 to Schliemann. Virchow was entitled to three copies and Boetticher to two. Niemann was responsible for editing the text, for which he received a fee of 300 marks from Schliemann; this prompted Boetticher to ask the Austrian Academy of Sciences in Vienna whether Niemann had actually been officially sent to Troy. Brockhaus distributed 50 extra copies of the protocol to newspaper editors. Meanwhile, the Austrian Anthropological Society, after hearing Niemann's report on his trip to Troy, decided "not to revisit the polemic between Schliemann and Böttlicher. By this time the captain had begun to explain that Schliemann and Emil Bürnuf had already destroyed all traces confirming his correctness in the 1870s. Schliemann, who had built a town on Troy and invested 12 to 16 thousand Marks in the organization (according to the estimates of different newspapers), decided to carry out additional excavations. Already in January 1890 it was clear that the American and French representatives —Charles Waldstein and Charles Babin— would arrive at the new conference. The German ambassador von Radowitz and Hamdi Bey, director of the Ottoman Museum, expedited the issuance of a firman for the search and exploration of the necropolises of Troy.

Schliemann had been excavating at Hissarlik since the beginning of March 1890, while Dörpfeld, who arrived from Cyprus on March 14, was building the narrow-gauge railroad. This was a key excavation season for Trojan archaeology, yielding New Stone Age finds, reconstructing the stratigraphy of the archaeological layers, and finding Mycenaean-type pottery. Friedrich von Dunn and the couple Baben arrived in the Dardanelles at the beginning of March, Hamdi Bey and C. Waldstein on the 27th and 28th. The conference officially began on Wednesday, March 26, and on the 30th its eight official participants (Babin, Waldstein, Virchow, Grampler, von Dunn, Calvert, Hamdi-bey, Humann) signed the minutes, which were immediately sent to Brockhaus and the Times. On the same day, the participants traveled to Timbra, the estate of Frank Calvert, and visited the archaeological sites of Hanay Tepe and Bunarbashi.

Ernst Boetticher categorically refused to recognize the decision of the second Troy conference. On May 19, Schliemann wrote irritably to Virchow that "Boetticher will polemicize until he is finally shot". The greater contrast was Schliemann's letter to Virchow of August 5, in which Heinrich reported that Boetticher was right: water poured into unglazed pythoses evaporated quickly in the sun through the porous surface of the walls. The excavations at Troy were completed on July 27. In early August 1890, Boetticher's book "Troy wie es ist" (Troy as it is) was published in Berlin at the author's expense, containing the minutes of both Troy conferences with his own comments. The book also included material from Boetticher's newspaper articles and a polemic with Georg Niemann. Schliemann, despite his deteriorating health, took his opponent's new argumentation very seriously and asked for Virchow's and Steffen's help. Virchow, as usual, recommended not to mention Boetticher's name. On December 23rd, at a meeting of the German Archaeological Institute in Athens, Dörpfeld announced the plan for the excavation of Troy for the next year, 1891. Schliemann did not have time to receive the news: he died in Naples on December 26, 1890.

=== After Schliemann's death ===
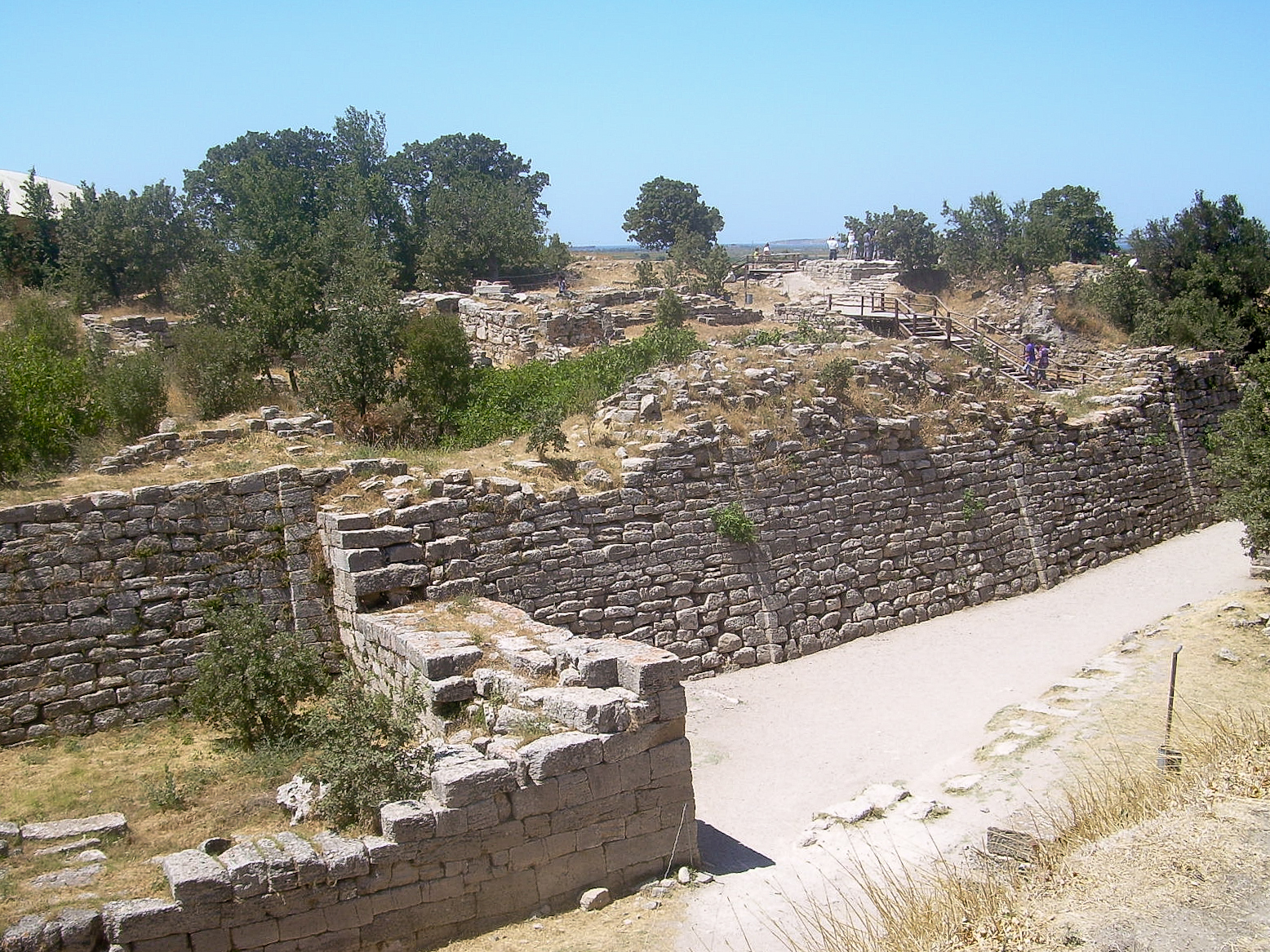
Walls of the Mycenaean city on Hissarlık, archaeological layer Troy VI

Parallel to the epochal findings of Schliemann and Dörpfeld in Troy, Carl Humann successfully conducted research on the Pergamon Altar. The restless Boetticher proclaimed this place a fiery necropolis, which caused very unpleasant epithets in the correspondence of the researchers. In the final report on the excavations at Hissarlik in 1894, Wilhelm Dörpfeld explicitly stated that it was "beneath his dignity" to oppose Boetticher in any way. However, this did not affect the activities of the Hauptmann himself, who continued to publish articles in support of his hypothesis and criticizing the methods of excavation at Troy. A great surprise for him was the allocation of 30,000 marks for the completion of the Trojan excavations on the personal order of Kaiser Wilhelm II. By this time it was clear that Schliemann's goal, Homer's Troy, was archaeological layer VI. According to Dörpfeld's later recollections, Heinrich was ready to admit this as early as the summer of 1890, but it was never publicly announced. Boetticher hastened to present his own work to the Kaiser, in which he repeated his theories and ridiculed Dörpfeld's conclusions. This provoked a rather lively discussion in the Allgemeine Konservative Monatsschrift für das christliche Deutschland. The fate of the manuscript was sadder: in November 1894 it was examined by the Directorate of the Royal Museums. The report was written by Hermann Winnefeld, who stated that Boetticher had shown "a unique unprincipled attitude combined with even greater ignorance. The manuscript was sent back to the author. G. Ebers also did not reply to Boetticher.

Nothing could stop Boetticher's enthusiasm. Despite publishers' refusals, in 1911, almost thirty years after the polemic began, Ernst Boetticher published his book on Troy as a Fiery Necropolis. According to the preface, the manuscript had been completed in 1906. Also in 1908, a monograph was announced, Ilion — the Altar of Sun Worship and its Fire Necropolis, the manuscript of which was never published and was lost. No later publications by M. Zavadil on this subject have been identified. There are many remarkable things about the tone of the book Trojan Forgery, especially its politicization. As early as 1909, the journalist Boetticher published an article entitled The English Policy of Hypocrisy and Treachery, in which he used the same epithets as in his archaeological publications. The area of fire necropolises in the ancient world was extended by the author as far as the Celtic settlements in Germany and the Egyptian Karnak. His conceit, reminiscent of Schliemann's (which did not exclude complaints of loneliness), is evidenced by the fact that when gold mining began at Thasos in 1905, he was proud that the project had been initiated by one of his newspaper articles from ten years earlier. Boetticher's correspondence shows that he exaggerated his importance in scientific circles. Not surprisingly, the discussion about the fire necropolises stopped after Schliemann's death and could not be revived even by Boetticher's new publications.

== Reputation ==
=== Academic habits and archaeology ===
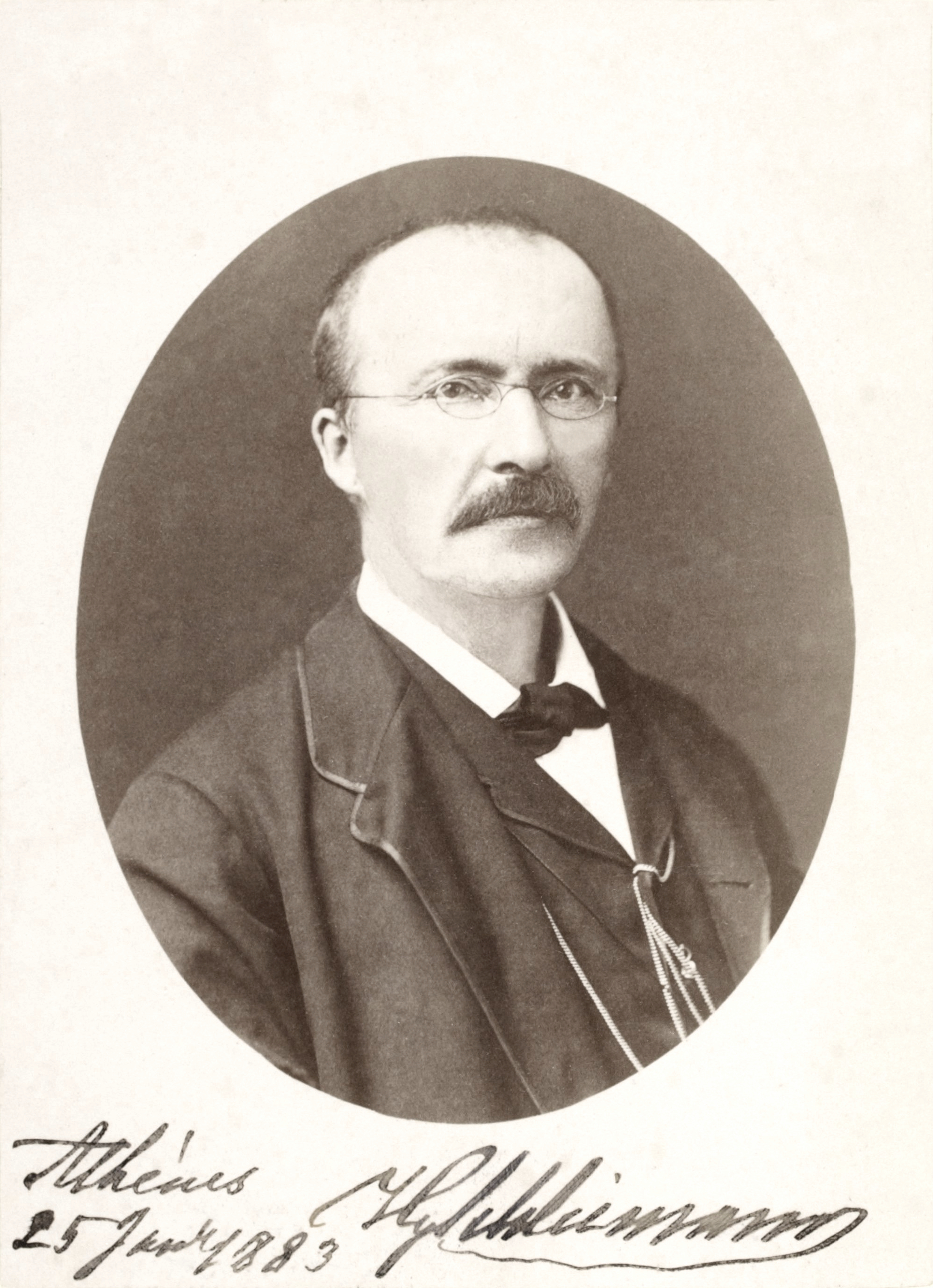
Heinrich Schliemann. Photo of 1883

In the 21st century, Ernst Boetticher's misfortune began to be investigated by German scholars who were concerned with the contribution of amateurs to the development of science. Special studies of amateur archaeology after 1996 were presented by Ulrich Evermann. Summarizing a number of studies, Matthias Jung concluded that the notion of habitus underlies the differences between the academically recognized scholar and the amateur. Archaeology is a discipline that requires the collection and evaluation of data from across the spectrum of empirical knowledge; moreover, excavation itself requires considerable interpretation. If scientific activity is understood as a methodologically regulated cognition of reality, then professional socialization requires, first of all, training in a certain habitus. A good excavation specialist will not necessarily be a competent analyst, and vice versa.

Matthias Jung, comparing the development of Schliemann's and Boetticher's personalities, noted that both were characterized by intelligence, reading, versatility of interests, and a stormy temperament that manifested itself in polemics. Neither Schliemann nor Boetticher had a systematic higher education. Heinrich Schliemann took a few courses at the Sorbonne during the academic semester of 1866; the university did not have the slightest influence on the acquisition of an empirical habitus, since this process requires a great deal of time and immersion in the university environment. Boetticher's specific interest in archaeology must be considered accidental, acquired in the course of trying to arrange his life after his retirement from military service. Schliemann's correspondence shows that he had a reverence for academia, sought recognition among scholars, and actively used his capital to hire specialists to evaluate his work. Schliemann was aware of the limits of his competence and willingly learned from specialists whose authority he recognized, such as Curtius or Virchow. Here his entrepreneurial habitus manifested itself, including extreme precision, self-discipline, and careful record keeping. This was fundamentally different from Böttlicher's strategy, who, as far as we can tell from the extant sources, never sought the advice of specialists, but sought to use their authority to confirm the theories he put forward. Schliemann's dilettantism was expressed in his opposition between field excavation and desk interpretation, for he naively believed that the finds, as material remains of ancient epochs, would "speak for themselves". Having found some ancient settlements according to Homeric texts, Schliemann believed that he had fully confirmed the truth of the reports of ancient sources, including legendary ones. Joachim Hermann, in his biography of Schliemann, noted that Schliemann's fieldwork was exemplarily documented and contrasted with his theoretical helplessness, bias, and tendency to simplify. The change in this position came gradually, mainly as a result of his interactions with Rudolf Virchow. Eduard Meyer noted that during the excavations of May 1879 Virchow succeeded in instilling in Schliemann the style of scientific thinking by personal example. As a result, in the last decade of his life, Schliemann learned not only to resist criticism, but also to accept the rational postulates of his critics and to reconsider his own conclusions in their light. This was also the difference with Böttlicher, who never changed his views once and for all. This was probably partly due to the absence of an authoritative mentor, which Virchow became for Schliemann. Whether Boetticher was able to abandon the hypothesis of the fiery necropolis under such conditions, as Schliemann on the eve of his death recognized his mistake with the dating of Homeric Troy, remains completely unverifiable.

=== Heroism analysis ===
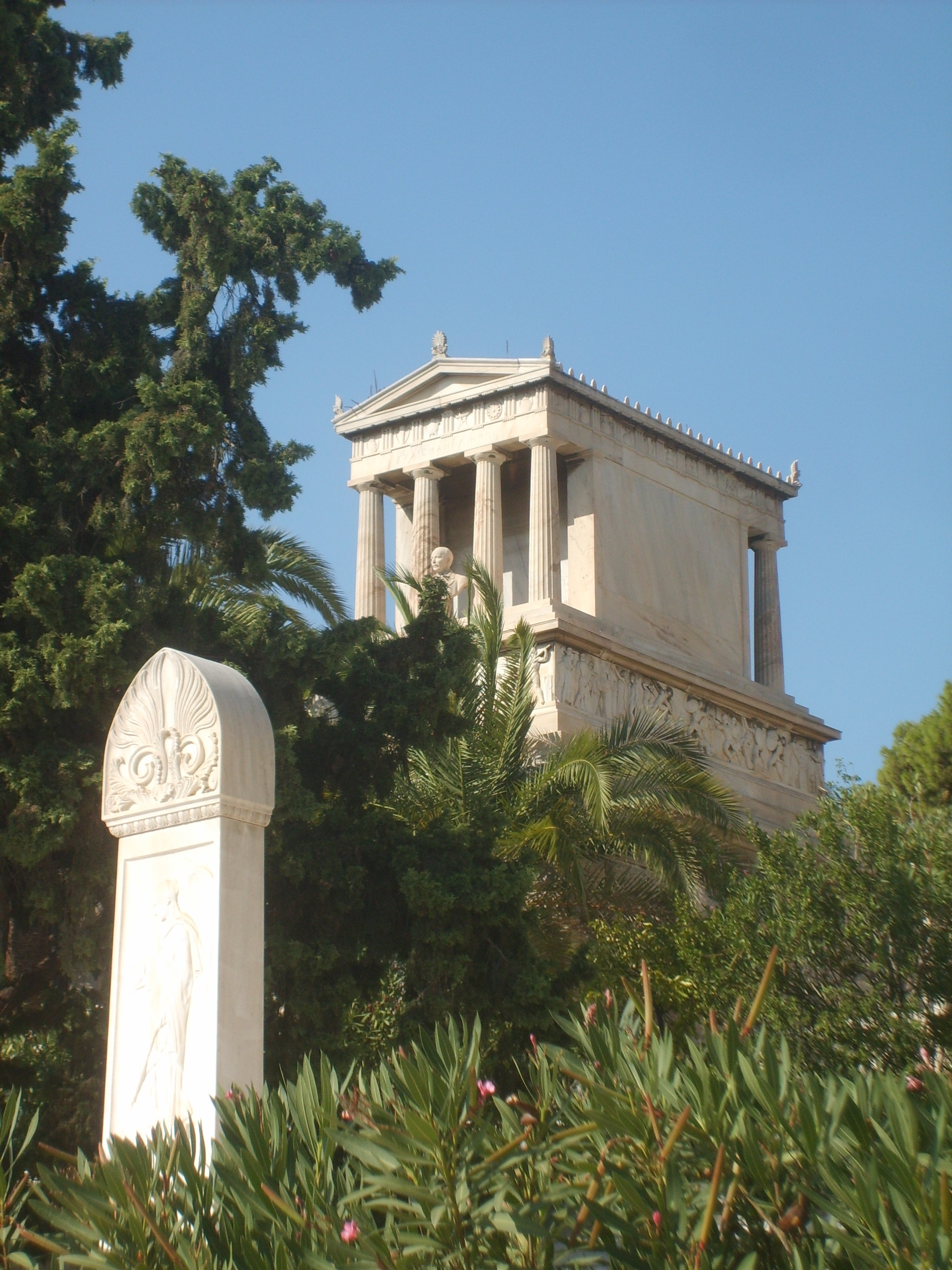
Schliemann Mausoleum. View from the north side

A special study on the formation of the opposing reputations of Schliemann and Boetticher was published in 2018 by Matthias Jung and Stefanie Samida. The researchers point out that archaeology as an academic discipline did not exist in the last third of the 19th century, when the classical disciplines dominated the universities. Classical archaeology was a development of antiquarianism, with which field practice had little correlation. Despite the erosion of the ideal of classical antiquity articulated by Winckelmann, the typology of art history he developed dominated scholars of ancient history. Classical archaeologists did indeed search for works of ancient art and (in Egypt) papyrus literary texts. Schliemann's discoveries at Troy and Mycenae in the 1870s were extremely slow to be accepted by the scientific community because the newly discovered cultures did not fit into the established picture, and the methods of prehistoric research had not yet been developed and were the domain of a few amateurs. The discoveries of the lake-dwelling culture in Switzerland and the Neanderthals near Düsseldorf in the mid-19th century were made by private individuals. The foundation of the Berlin Society for Anthropology, Ethnography and Primitive History in 1869 on the initiative of R. Virchow helped to raise the prestige of archaeological studies and greatly expanded the thematic and research scope of this discipline. Virchow, on the other hand, became the main mediator between academia and private enthusiasts, organized in a vast number of associations, clubs and societies, mostly united by ideas of ancient Germanic exceptionalism and German nationalism. Schliemann, who made extensive use of the press, illustrated publications, and public speaking, contributed to the institutionalization of a new branch of archaeology that was not immediately accepted by academic science. Leo Klejn believed that Schliemann's discoveries played a prominent role in the development of archaeology because they linked together previously disparate prehistoric, ancient eastern, and Hellenic studies. Until the time of Schliemann and Virchow's work, archaeology was dominated by the concept of "epoch," which had been borrowed from geology. Instead, the concept of "typus" (in Virchow's terminology) or "civilization" (the French term used by Schliemann) was introduced — an integral territorial-ethnic reference of monuments.

Heinrich Schliemann deliberately built up publicity for his activities and pursued a consistent policy of glorification. The discovery of the Priam's Treasure in 1873 became a world sensation, but did not lead to a serious perception of his discoveries by scientific authorities. The legitimization of his discoveries, according to S. Samida and M. Jung, was carried out in accordance with the "neohumanist canon of values of the educated bourgeois class". The culmination of this process was Schliemann's burial in a special mausoleum, built according to ancient canons, with the dedication to Hero Schliemann (Greek ΗΡΩΙ ΣΧΛΙΜΑΝΝΝΩΙ). (Note: A typology of heroics in science was formulated by Monika Mommertz, associate professor at the University of Basel. Among the attributes of a hero the following were cited: 1. The knowledge obtained is exceptional, and the innovation of which is often not perceived by contemporaries. 2. Detachment from immediate interests. 3. Absolute devotion to scientific work, which is perceived as a vocation and way of life, dictated by higher forces. 4. Willingness to risk health and well-being of life (up to social and physical death) in the name of the triumph of knowledge. 5. The courage to stand up for one's views in the face of spiritual or secular authorities, and other powerful forces. 6. The temperament of a fighter and warrior.)

Ernst Boetticher's military service and two wars brought him closer to the classical ideal of the hero. The strategy he developed to promote his ideas showed traits of persistence that turned into obsession. After proposing the hypothesis of the "fiery necropolis", he tried to apply it to all the archaeological sites of the ancient world, which could only lead to ridicule. Thus, in 1887, Robert Caldeway misinterpreted the findings of the settlement sites of Surgul and El-Khib (Mesopotamia) and claimed to have discovered "fiery necropolises". However, instead of using Koldewey's publication for his own purposes, Boetticher began a dispute over the priority of his discovery of "fiery necropolises" at Troy, which had been made by a "spiritual eye". He did not realize that Koldewey was using the term to describe the results of the excavations, while the retired captain himself was trying to prove the existence of a ritual of corpse burning common to the ancient cultures of Anatolia and the Near East, and was using Feuernekropole as a generic term. Boettlicher's lone hero strategy (he liked to quote Goethe in his correspondence) was misguided for an era of revolutionary change in archaeological scholarship; ultimately, the status he sought as a cabinet scholar worked against him. Because of his psychological traits, Boetticher easily took on personalities in communication in an attempt to discredit the integrity and competence of his opponents. In time, he became a conspiracy theorist and declared that Schliemann, Virchow, and Dörpfeld had massively distorted the results of the excavations. He presented all his "arguments" in the book Trojan Forgery, which was published at his own expense in 1911. According to M. Jung and S. Samid, it expressed the typical features of a layman's activity in science.

The fact that the aggressive dilettante E. Boetticher has remained in the history of science, according to M. Jung and S. Samid, is explained by the fact that he played the role of a "catalyst" in the process of recognition of Schliemann's discoveries by the professional community. Specialists who had become familiar with the polemics between Schliemann and Boetticher could not but defend Schliemann's positions. After Schliemann's death, Ernst Boetticher ceased to make statements, thus finally destroying his reputation. It is noteworthy that in this situation contemporaries actively used the metaphor of the Trojan War, which was projected onto the Hissarlık conferences: Schliemann — The owner of Troy, Boetticher — The leader of the Achaeans. A publication in the Berlin satirical magazine Kladderadatsch became a landmark. In the cartoon, Schliemann appeared as both the Lord of Priam's Hail and his Columbus, while the "artillery captain" Boetticher entertained him with salutes.

== Historiography ==
Ernst Boetticher's legacy in the annals of scientific history is largely contingent upon his polemical engagement with Schliemann, which he continued to pursue even after the latter's demise. The initial monographic study of this polemic was only published in 2009. Mikaela Zavadil's book included the inaugural compilation of biographical information, as well as the publication and research of Boetticher and the two Hissarlık conferences of 1889-1890. The reviewer, Moritz Kinzel, commended the high quality of the textual work and highlighted M. Zawadil's endeavor to address the question of how the trajectory of Trojan archaeology might have unfolded had Schliemann heeded the counsel of R. Virchow and W. Dörpfeld and not been influenced by the publications of E. Boetticher. The author concluded that E. Boetticher's "attack," which was characterized by inaccurate expressions, contributed to the heightened interest of scientific circles in Trojan archaeology and facilitated the introduction of W. Dörpfeld's stratigraphic method, which enabled the precise dating of the findings at Troy in the 1890s. In her review, Stephanie Samida of the University of Tübingen highlights that the publication of the book on Boetticher illustrates that even at the beginning of the 21st century, the biography of his opponent, Schliemann, still contains significant gaps. The portrayal of the polemic between Boetticher and Schliemann in the press and published monographs differs from the arguments and assessments presented in the personal correspondence of the participants in the discussion. The biography of Boetticher is of significant merit, as it illuminates aspects of his personality, education, and range of interests that were previously unknown. Of particular note is the corpus of correspondence, which comprises 219 letters. Over 180 of Boetticher's own letters and notes were published for the first time in this work. The book's principal shortcoming is its undue emphasis on the protagonist's personality, which precludes an analysis of the conflict between Boetticher and Schliemann as typical of Schliemann's relationship with his opponents.

== Publications ==
The following bibliography is given in the monograph by M. Zavadil:

- Schliemann’s Troja eine urzeitliche Feuernekropole // Das Ausland. 1883. Bd. 56, Nr. 51 (17. Dezember). pp. 1010—1015; Nr. 52 (24. Dezember). pp. 1028—1030.
- Tiryns und Hissarlik als Feuer-Nekropolen von terrassiertem Aufbau // Zeitschrift für Museologie und Antiquitätenkunde. 1884. Bd. 7, Nr. 21 (15. November). pp. 161—168.
- Die Feuer-Nekropole Hissarlik und Schliemanns Architekt Herr Dr. W. Dörpfeld // Zeitschrift für Museologie und Antiquitätenkunde. 1884. Bd. 7, Nr. 24 (31. Dezember). pp. 189—191.
- Hissarlikllion, Protokoll der Verhandlungen zwischen Dr. Schliemann und Hauptmann Boetticher, 1.—6. December 1889. Leipzig: F. A. Brockhaus, 1890. P. 19.
- Hissarlik wie es ist, fünftes Sendschreiben über Schliemann’s «Troja» von Ernst Boetticher. Auf Grund der Untersuchungen vom 1. bis 6. Dezember 1889 und im Frühjahr und Sommer 1890. Nebst Protokoll der Zeugen. Berlin: im Selbstverlage des Verfassers, 1890. P. 115.
- Hissarlik als Feuernekropole // Zeitschrift für bildende Kunst N. F. 1889/90 Bd. 1, Nr. 11 (August). pp. 333—339.
- Troja oder Feuernekropole. I. Babylonische Feuernekropolen // Zeitschrift für Volkskunde (Leipzig). 1890/91. Bd. 3. pp. 61—74.
- Schliemann’s Troja und Virchow’s Forschung // Der Stein der Weisen (Wien). 1893. Bd. 9. pp. 199—209, 232—240, 266—274.
- Der trojanische Humbug: beleuchtet von Ernst Bötticher. Berlin: im eigenen Verlag, 1911. XXXIII, 258 S. 54 fig.

== Bibliography ==
- Jung, M. (2015). «Citizen Science» — eine Programmatik zur Rehabilitierung des Handelns wissenschaftlicher Laiinnen und Laien und ihre Implikationen für die Archäologie [“Citizen Science” - a program to rehabilitate the actions of lay scientists and their implications for archaeology] (PDF) (in German). Forum Kritische Archäologie. pp. 42–54.
- Jung, M.; Samida, S. (2018). Heros oder "Mad Scientist"? Selbstheroisierungen von Amateurarchäologen im 19. Jahrhundert [Hero or "Mad Scientist"? Self-heroizations of amateur archaeologists in the 19th century] (PDF) (in German). Helden. Heroes. Héros. E-Journal zu Kulturen des Heroischen. pp. 47–61.
- Mommertz, M. (2018). Heroization in science, scholarship, and knowledge-production: the intellectual hero in transdisciplinary and trans-epochal perspective. Helden. Heroes. Héros. E-Journal zu Kulturen des Heroischen. pp. 3–12.
- Samida, S. (2011). Ein trojanischer Federkrieg. Die Auseinandersetzungen zwischen Ernst Boetticher und Heinrich Schliemann [A Trojan feather war. The disputes between Ernst Boetticher and Heinrich Schliemann] (in German). Vol. 83. Gnomon. pp. 647–652. JSTOR 41419563.
- Zavadil, M. (2009). Ein trojanischer Federkrieg: die Auseinandersetzungen zwischen Ernst Boetticher und Heinrich Schliemann [A Trojan feather war: the disputes between Ernst Boetticher and Heinrich Schliemann]. Sitzungsberichte. Österreichische Akademie der Wissenschaften. Philosophisch-Historische Klasse (in German). Wien: Verlag der Österreichischen Akademie der Wissenschaften. p. 490. ISBN 978-3-700-16505-7.
- Klein, L. S. (2011). История археологической мысли. В 2 т. [History of archaeological thought. In 2 vol.] (in Russian). Vol. 1. СПб.: Изд. Санкт-Петербургского ун-та. p. 688. ISBN 978-5-288-05166-1.
