= Gustav von Rohden =

Gustav von Rohden (22 April 1855 in Barmen – 9 May 1942 in Ballenstedt) was a German clergyman and the author of books on various social issues (the welfare of former prisoners, sexual ethics, etc.).

From 1882 he served as a pastor in Helsingfors (Helsinki), Finland. After returning to Germany, he worked as a prison chaplain in Dortmund (from 1895). Beginning in 1908 he held the position of Konsistorialrat in Berlin, and in 1912 became a pastor in the town of Spören, near Bitterfeld. From 1919 to 1923 he was director of the Frauenschule der Inneren Mission (Women's School of the Inner Mission) in Berlin.

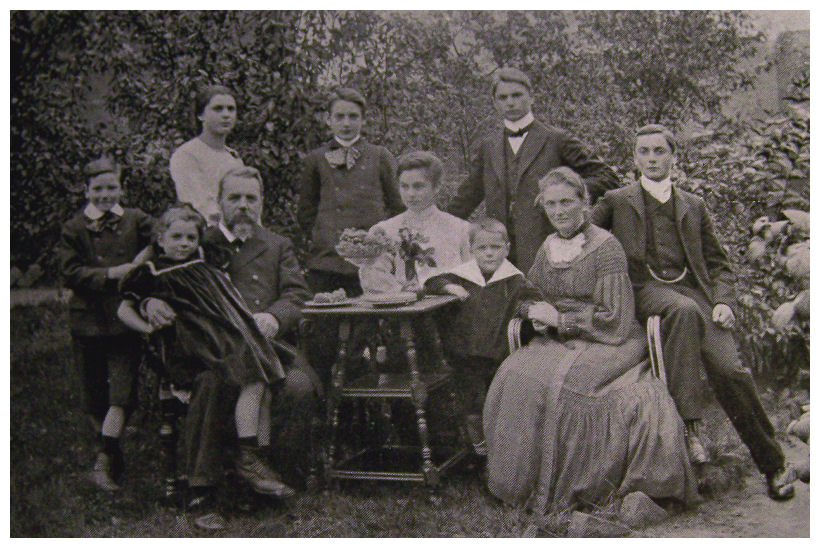
The family of Gustav von Rohden, (29 September 1906).

He was the son of theologian Ludwig von Rohden (1815–1889) and the brother of archaeologist Hermann von Rohden (1852–1916) and historian Paul von Rohden (1862–1939).

== Selected works ==
- Darstellung und Beurteilung der Pädagogik (1884) – Presentation and evaluation of education.
- Geschichte der Rheinisch-Westfälischen Gefängnis-Gesellschaft: Festschrift zum 75jährigen Bestehen der Gesellschaft (1901) – History of the Rhenish-Westphalian Prison Association
- Probleme der Gefangenenseelsorge und Entlassenenfürsorge (1908) – Book concerning the welfare of released prisoners.
- Sexualethik (1918) – Sexual ethics
- Ehe und freie Liebe: Ein Wort zur Individualismus in der Frauenfrage (1919) – Marriage and free love.
- Jesus und der Sozialismus (1920) – Jesus and socialism.
- Die neue Ethik und der Krieg (1920) – The new ethics and the war.
- Hundert Jahre Geschichte der Rheinisch-Westfälischen Gefängnis-Gesellschaft 1826-1926 (1926) – One hundred years of history involving the Rhenish-Westphalian Prison Association 1826–1926.
