= Paul von Rohden =

German-Swiss teacher and historian (1862-1939)

Paul von Rohden (12 December 1862, Barmen – 28 February 1939, Pieterlen) was a German-Swiss schoolteacher and historian known for his research in the field of prosopography. He was the son of theologian Ludwig von Rohden (1815–1889) and the brother of archaeologist Hermann von Rohden (1852–1916) and theologian Gustav von Rohden (1855–1942).

He studied history in Leipzig and Berlin, where he was influenced by Theodor Mommsen. From 1889 onward, he taught classes at the gymnasium in Steglitz, afterwards relocating to Davos in Switzerland, where in 1896 he worked briefly as a tutor. Beginning in 1899 he taught classes in ancient languages and other subjects at the Fridericianum Davos. Starting in the winter of 1913/14 he gave lectures in Davos Platz.

== Published works ==
He wrote many articles involving the Roman Empire in Pauly's Realencyclopädie der Classischen Altertumswissenschaft. His other principal works are the following:

- "De Palaestina et Arabia provinciis Romanis quaestiones selectae". Berlin 1885 (dissertation).
- "Prosopographia Imperii Romani saec. I. II. III". Berlin 1897–98 (edited along with Elimar Klebs and Hermann Dessau).
