= August Baumeister =

German educator and classical philologist

Karl August Baumeister (24 April 1830, in Hamburg – 22 May 1922, in Munich) was a German educator and classical philologist.

== Biography ==
From 1848 to 1852 he studied philology at the Universities of Göttingen and Erlangen, afterwards taking study trips through Greece, Asia Minor, Italy and France (1853-1855). After his return to Germany, he worked in the education service at Blochmann's Institute ("Vitzthum Gymnasium") in Dresden (1855), then at the Französisches Gymnasium in Berlin (1856). He later served as an educator in the cities of Elberfeld, Lübeck, Gera and Halberstadt.

In 1871 he relocated to Strasbourg, where he was appointed Regierungsrat. In 1882 he was relieved of his duties in Strasbourg by Edwin von Manteuffel, the governor of Alsace-Lorraine. Subsequently, he settled in Munich as a writer.

For his work involving pictures of ancient buildings, statues and artifacts, he employed "autotypy", a photographic process that had recently been developed by Georg Meisenbach (1841-1912). Baumeister was the primary author of a highly regarded educational manual for secondary schools titled Handbuch der Erziehungs- und Unterrichtslehre für höhere Schulen.

== Published works ==
- "Prolegomena critica ad Batrachomyomachiam", (dissertation), Göttingen 1852.
- Hymni Homerici, 1860.
- Topographische Skizze der Insel Euboia, 1864 – Topographical sketches of Euboea.
- Culturbilder aus Griechenlands Religion und Kunst : populäre Vorträge, 1865 – On Greek religion and art: popular lectures.
- "Spicilegi critici in scriptores Graecos et Latinos particula", 1869.
- Denkmäler des klassischen Altertums zur Erläuterung des Lebens der Griechen und Römer in Religion, Kunst und Sitte, 1885–88.(3 volumes, primary author) – Monuments of classical antiquity to illustrate the life of the Greeks and Romans in religion, art and customs.
- Bilder aus dem griechischen und römischen Altertum für Schüler, 1889 – Pictures from Greek and Roman antiquity for students.
- Handbuch der Erziehungs- und Unterrichtslehre für höhere Schulen, 1895–98 (4 volumes) – Handbook of educational and teaching instruction for secondary schools.
