= Johann Georg Greisel =

Austrian physician

Johann Georg Greisel (died 18 May 1684) was an Austrian physician.

Greisel worked as a military field surgeon, a professor of anatomy at the University of Vienna, an assessor for the Medical University of Vienna, and as the physician to the city of Znojmo in Moravia. He died in Znojmo on 18 May 1684.

Greisel was elected a member of the Deutsche Akademie der Naturforscher Leopoldina in 1670 and contributed many papers to the Miscellanea curiosa, the society's proceedings. He published one known book, a treatise on the cure of arthritis using milk.

== Works ==
Tractatus medicus de cura lactis in arthritide. Vienna: Typis Joannis Jacobi Kürner, 1670.
