= Hermann Winnefeld =

German classical archaeologist

- Born: 4 September 1862; Überlingen, Grand Duchy of Baden
- Died: 30 April 1918 (aged 55); Berlin, German Empire
- Education: University of Bonn
- Scientific career
- Fields: Archeology
- Workplaces: University of Bonn

Hermann Winnefeld (4 September 1862, Überlingen – 30 April 1918, Berlin) was a German classical archaeologist.

He studied classics in Heidelberg and Bonn from 1881 to 1884, and subsequently became a research assistant at the Großherzogliche Vereinigte Sammlungen in Karlsruhe. In 1887 he received his doctorate from the University of Bonn with the thesis "Sortes Sangallenses ineditae". With a scholarship from the German Archaeological Institute, he conducted archaeological research in Italy and Greece from 1887 to 1889.

In 1890 he started work as an assistant at the Berlin Museum, and several years later became an associate professor at the University of Münster (1895). In 1896 he returned to Berlin as an assistant manager of museum sculpture collections, and during the following year, began teaching classes at the University of Berlin as a non-faculty lecturer. In 1906 he was appointed deputy director of the sculpture collections. His main works include a monograph on Hadrian's villa near Tivoli (1895) and a description of the Pergamon Altar frieze.

== Selected works ==
- Hypnos; ein archäologischer versuch, 1886.
- Beschreibung der Vasensammlung : Großherzogliche Vereinigte Sammlungen zu Karlsruhe, 1887 – Description of the collection of vases: United Grand Ducal collections in Karlsruhe.
- Die Villa des Hadrian bei Tivoli, 1895.
- Altgriechisches bronzebecken aus Leontini, 1899.
- Hellenistische silberreliefs im Antiquarium der Königlichen museen, 1908 – Hellenistic silver reliefs in the Antiquarium of the Royal Museum.
- Die Friese des groszen Altars, 1910.
- Architektonische Römische Tonreliefs der Kaiserzeit, 1911 (with Hermann von Rohden) – Roman architectural clay reliefs of the Imperial Period.
