= Hermann von Rohden =

German archaeologist

Hermann von Rohden (21 February 1852, in Barmen – 21 February 1916, in Haguenau) was a German educator and classical archaeologist known for his analyses of ancient Roman terracotta artifacts.

He studied classical philology, art history and archaeology at the Universities of Bonn (1871/72) and Leipzig (1873/74). As a student, he was influenced by archaeologist Reinhard Kekulé von Stradonitz, philologists Franz Bücheler and Hermann Usener and art historian Anton Springer. Following graduation, with a travel grant from the German Archaeological Institute, he embarked on a study trip to Italy and Greece. After his return to Germany, he worked as a schoolteacher in Hagenau, where in 1899 he attained the title of Gymnasialprofessor.

== Published works ==
- "De mundi miraculis quaestiones selectae", Bonn 1875 (dissertation).
- Die Terracotten von Pompeji, Stuttgart 1880 (Volume 1 of Reinhard Kekulé von Stradonitz: Die antiken Terracotten) – The terracotta of Pompeii.
- Zum Hermes des Praxiteles, In: "Jahrbuch des Kaiserlichen Deutschen Archäologischen Instituts", Band 2 (1887) – On the Hermes by Praxiteles.
- Die Panzerstatuen mit Reliefverzierung In: Bonner Studien. Aufsätze aus der Altertumswissenschaft,(dedicated to the memory of Reinhard Kekulé's teaching activity in Bonn). Berlin, 1890, pp. 1-20. "Panzer statues" with relief decoration.
- Die Typen der figürlichen Terrakotten, 1903 (Volumes 2 & 3 of Die antiken Terracotten, with Reinhard Kekulé, Franz Winter) – Types of figurative terracotta.
- Architektonische römische Tonreliefs der Kaiserzeit (in collaboration with Hermann Winnefeld). Berlin, 1911 – Architectural Roman clay reliefs of the Imperial Period.

He also made significant contributions to August Baumeister's 3 volume "Denkmäler des klassischen Altertums zur Erläuterung des Lebens der Griechen und Römer in Religion, Kunst und Sitte" (Monuments of classical antiquity to illustrate the life of the Greeks and Romans in religion, art and customs).
