= Leemo Hadiya =

Subgroup of Hadiya people in Ethiopia

Coordinates: 7°40′N 38°00′E

Leemo people
Total population
- Over 2 million (2020)

Regions with significant populations
- Southern Nations, Nationalities, and Peoples' Region

Languages
- Various, formerly strictly Hadiyya language

Religion
- Christianity, Islam, Fandaanano

Related ethnic groups
- Sooro, Shaashoogo, Baadawwaachcho, Libidoo/Maraqo/Marako, Halaba, Qabeena, Oromo, Sidama, Harari, Argobba, Kambata, Afar, Somali, Gurage, Wolayta

The Leemo are a Hadiya sub-group in south-central Ethiopia. The Leemo are one of the current Hadiyya (Hadiyyisa) speaking groups in the administrative unit of Hadiya Zone (also known as the Hadiya proper) that includes Hadiya subgroups Sooro, Shaashoogo, Baadawwaachcho, Weexo Giira (Baadogo, Haballo, Bargaago, Waayabo, Hayyibba, Hoojje, Sha’ammanna, Gabara, and Hanqaallo), in addition to Leemo. The Leemo primarily occupy the northern part of Hadiya Zone. Part of the Leemo settlement surrounds the zonal capital city of Hosaena.

== Origins ==
The genealogy of Leemo – and the scattered clans of the Weexo-Giira – can be traced back to the Gudolla ancestry (one of the constituent groups of the Hadiya Sultanate), already referred to in the chronicle of Emperor Amdä Ṣəyon (1314–44). As was the case with other pastoralist Hadiya subgroups, the Leemo have changed their settlement areas due to migration within the east and central regions of Ethiopia.

It is documented that Hube or Hubaychoo appears as a forefather of the Leemo Hadiyya resulting out of a liaison of his father Annaqqo with a woman who is said to have come from Arabia. Hube is also significantly preserved in the Oromo name Hubanaa (Hube anna), the Hadiyya word for father or offspring. Hubanaa is believed to be the ancestor of many Arsii, Anniyya, and Barento Oromo who then developed into independent ethnic groups in the following generations.

Raya, Azaaboo and Ashaange are specified as the three sons of Hubanaa. They were born in Dallo where Hubanaa is supposed to have lived. The Oromo obviously absorbed Hadiya so completely in this region that since then the Rayyaa, for example, simply count as one of the "most senior groups of all the Oromo". Rayyaa, Azaboo, and Ashaange, groups closely associated with the old Hadiyya stratum, first crossed the Awash at the beginning of the 17th century and then advanced along the eastern escarpment of the Ethiopian highlands as far as Tigray. In Arsi Oromo, the name Rayyaa designates the name of an ancestor and a descending ethnic group and it also stands for one of the four sections of the Arsi Oromo which are defined according to topographical criteria, namely the area between the rivers Wabi Šaballe, Ganaale and Wayb. Rayyaa is just another version of Raayituu, the name of the clan still living in that area today. The name of Hubanaa's second son Azaaboo is preserved in present-day Tigray. The third son, Ashaange, is represented as an ethnic and geographic designation in the border area of Wollo and Tigray. Of all the Hubanaa descendants only a section of the Ashaange, specifically the Leemo, distinctively preserved their ethnic identity as Hadiyya. The Leemo are the sole group within the Rayyaa-Ashaange-Azaboo cluster who do not speak Oromiffaa but have preserved their identity as Cushitic-speaking Hadiyya. Aashanchcho, derived from this name, has remained a common ethnonym of the Leemo until today and the traditional title of their rulers is Asha’n Garad.

== Notable Leemo Hadiya ==
- Abägaz Gädecho Hemacho – was one of the self-appointed Hadiya leaders, including Abagaz Baddigo and Abagaz Agisho, who mobilized the people of Hadiya and Kambata and was able to raise the standard of rebellion (locally known as the Gädecho Mekemekato or Ulbich Qäsha) in 1936 against the Shäwan conquerors after the latter was defeated at the Battle of Maichäw.

== See also ==
- Hadiya Sultanate
- Hadiya Zone
- Hadiyya language
- Raytu
- List of Oromo subgroups and clans
