= Battle of Webi River =

Date	1576
Location	Hadiya, Ethiopia
Result	Ethiopian victory

Belligerents
Ethiopian Empire	Adal Sultanate

Commanders and leaders
Sarsa Dengel	Muhammad ibn Nasir (executed)

Casualties and losses
Unknown	Heavy; entire force annihilated

The Battle of Webi River was fought in 1576 between the forces of Adal led by Muhammad ibn Nasir, and the Abyssinian army, under Sarsa Dengel. The outcome of this last war proved to be the end of the political importance of Harar, as the invading Muslim force was liquidated. This major defeat ended Harar’s status as a major military power and permanently ceased its aggression towards Ethiopia. With the battle and the resulting executions of the Adalite nobility, Harar as a military power "was extinguished forever" in the words of historian J. Spencer Trimingham.

== Battle ==
While campaigning in Wej province, Sarsa Dengel learned that Muhammad ibn Nasir had killed all the Muslim leaders that were friendly to the Christian empire in the area. The Emperor then established himself at Sharkha and sent thirty scouts to locate the whereabouts of the Adalite army, the scouts learned that Muhammad's army was established in the Hadiya area along the Weyib River and was also joined by an army led by Asmadin, a chief of Wej.

The Emperor then marched into the area and encamped within sight of the enemy. The two armies then fought a series of inconclusive battles where a number of Muhammad's men defected to the Abyssinians, the fighting grew so fierce that the Emperor erected a defensive rampart around the camp. Muhammad, seeing that it was impossible to advance any further decided to return to Harar, the Emperor then attempted to lure him into a battle by pretending to be afraid and acting like he was about to flee. This strategy was successful and a major engagement was fought between the Muslims and the Abyssinians. Asmadin then decided to defect to Sarsa Dengel with sixty of his horsemen and a large number of other soldiers.

Muhammad ibn Nasir, realizing that the battle was lost, finally decided to retreat back to Adal and rode off with fifty horsemen. However along the way the Adalites looted the oxen belonging to some Hadiya peasants, the peasants were outraged and blocked the escape routes. As a result, Muhammad and most of his men were captured by the Abyssinians. Consequently, Muhammad was executed, along with numerous other notable Adalite leaders and three sons of Nur ibn Mujahid.

According to James Bruce; "The whole Moorish army perished this day, except the horse, either by the sword or in the river, nor had the Moors received so severe a blow since the defeat of Gragne by Claudius (Gelawdewos)."
