= Arsi people =

Subgroup of Oromo ethnic groups in southern Ethiopia

Arsi
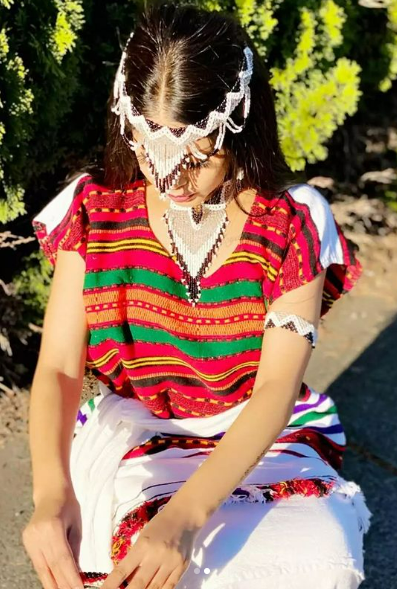
- An Arsi Oromo attending an Irreechaa celebration

Regions with significant populations
- Arsi Zone & West Arsi Zone, Oromia, Ethiopia

Languages
- Oromo

Religion
- Sunni Islam

The Arsi Oromo is an ethnic Oromo branch, inhabiting the Arsi, West Arsi and Bale Zones of the Oromia Region of Ethiopia, as well as in the Adami Tullu and Jido Kombolcha woreda of East Shewa Zone.The Arsi are made up of the Sikkoo-Mandoo branch of Barento Oromo. The Arsi in all zones speaks Oromo share the same culture, traditions and identity with other subgroup Oromo.

== Culture ==
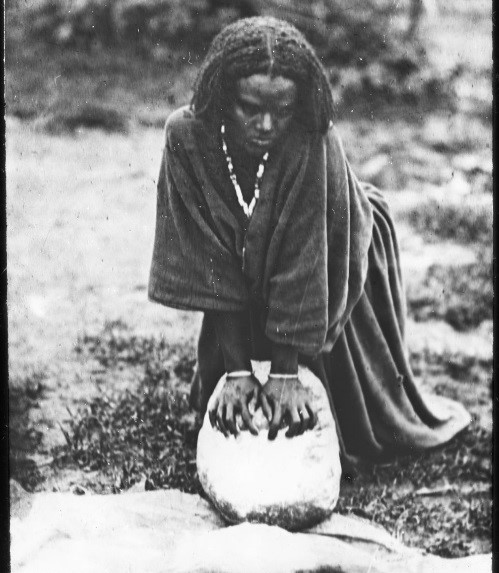
Photo of an Arsi girl making flour in the late 19th century by Jules Borelli

The Arsi developed a concept of Arsooma which roughly translates to Arsihood. This has provided Arsi with an identity that has been passing to clans and other groupings for a long period of time. The Arsi have a complex concept of clan division. The two main branches are Mandoo and Sikko. Mandoo refers to the Arsis in the Arsi and northern Bale Zones, while Sikko refers to those mainly in the Bale Zone.

== History ==
Arsi Oromo state an intermarriage took place between their ancestors and previous inhabitants of the Arsi Province, Adere (Harari) whom they call the Hadiya. Hadiya clans claim their forefathers were Harari however they later became influenced by Sidama.

In the early years of the eleventh century, the Islamic faith had already become well-established in Bale, a primary region of the Arsis. Proof of this can be seen in the existence of a mosque named Dobbi, which was constructed in the year 460 AH (1067 AD) and was situated in the Gasara area. Furthermore, the construction of two additional mosques, one in Balla in 1067 and the other in Zuqum in the year 1075, also testified to the presence of a Muslim sultanate referred to as Bali at this time.

The establishment of the Islamic faith in the region of Bale was not the only significant development in Arsiland at this time, however, as the twelfth century also brought about the emergence of several other Muslim sultanates in the southeastern parts of what is now Ethiopia. These sultanates included Dawaro, Sharkha, Arababni, Dara, Wej province and Hadiya, and they were responsible for exerting a direct influence on the religious conditions within the Arsi Oromo territories. According to historical records, some of these sultanates were founded on parts or all of the land now occupied by the Arsi Oromo people.

In the beginning of the early seventeenth century, the lands of Arsi Oromo were under the Emirate of Harar however the Emirate gradually lost control in the following centuries.

Arsi Oromo were largely independent and ruling under their own Gadaa Republic until about the 19th century. The Arsi under their leader Nur Hussien from Harar demonstrated fierce resistance in coordination with the Hadiya rebel leader Hassan Enjamo against Menelik II's invasions of 1881-6, when Menelik II conducted several unsuccessful invasion campaigns against their territory. Although Arsi put up stiff opposition against an enemy equipped with modern European firearms, they were finally defeated in 1886. The remaining Arsi in Bale were conquered in 1893, but the region would not be pacified until 1897.

During Lij Iyasu's conflict with the Shewan court, influential Arsi Muslims led by a man named Kabir Manza Mame sent a delegation to Chercher in support of Iyasu. The delegation consisted of influential men from Dide'a such as Haji Wule Sadiqo, Roba Mohammed, Haji Mamma Bori, Haji Mohammed Aruss, Omar Turo, Haji Hussien Qame, and many others. The objective of this meeting was reportedly to discuss the possibility of organizing Arsi fighters to take revenge on their enemies. To facilitate this, Kabir Manza was promoted to Dejazmach status. Upon their return, these individuals organized a solidarity movement with the deposed prince. The supporters of the movement called themselves Allah da’imuu, a combination of the Arabic word (God) and the word da’imuu, of Oromo origin, which means to crawl (to move slowly). The goal was to wage Jihad. The local population were mobilized, viewing the movement justly and sacredly. At the same time, Ras Mikael, Iyasu's father, was arming to restore his son to power. The Arsi attacked villages of the Neftenya and burned down numerous churches. The revolt lasted several weeks, however after the defeat at the Battle of Segale, a Shewan army under Ras Tafari suppressed the revolt.

In the 1940s the Arsi Oromo with the people of Bale province joined the Harari Kulub movement an affiliate of the Somali Youth League that peacefully opposed Amhara Christian domination of Hararghe. The Ethiopian government brutally suppressed the ethno-religious movement using violence.

During the 1970s the Arsi faced persecution by the Ethiopian government thus formed alliances with Somalia.

== Notable people ==
- Sheikh Hussein, Islamic Scholar
- Waqo Gutu, Leader and revolutionary
- Jawar Mohammed, Journalist and Activist
- Kenenisa Bekele, Athlete
- Tirunesh Dibaba, Athlete
- Derartu Tulu, Athlete
- Genzebe Dibaba, Athlete
- Birhanu Jula, Ethiopian Defence Force Minister
- Sifan Hassan, Athlete
- Mohammed Aman, Athlete
- Fatuma Roba, Athlete
- Gelete Burka, Athlete
