= Battle of Hadiya =

Battle of Hadiya may refer to:

- Battle of Hadiya (1569), Hadiya rebellion suppressed by the Abyssinian state
- Battle of Hadiya (1600s), Hadiya successfully rebels against Abyssinia and becomes an independent state
