= Endagabatan =

Historical region of Ethiopia

Endagabatan (Amharic: እንደገብጠን) also known as Enda Gabtan, Anda Gabtan, or Endagabton was a historical province of Ethiopia. Located north west of the old Fatagar region, bounded by Mugar, Gudar as well as Abay rivers. The region is in modern west Shewa province.

== History ==
In the 13th century it was under the Kingdom of Damot. The region was likely under Ethiopian Christian control during Emperor Amda Seyon by the 14th century however it was contested by the Muslim Ifat Sultanate's Sabr ad-Din I. The region's inhabitants were mostly the now extinct Gafat people. Endagabatan was invaded by the Adal Sultanate under Ahmad ibn Ibrahim al-Ghazi in the middle of the sixteenth century. In 1563 the region was also the site of a rebellion led by Emperor Sarsa Dengel's cousin Hamalmal which is known as the Battle of Endagabatan. Modern day Endagabatan was incorporated into Shewa province in the 19th century.

In the 1600s, Emperor Susenyos I set up camp at Endagabatan while en route to confront the Hadiya leader, Sidi Mohammed.

== See also ==
- History of Ethiopia
