= Aze (chief) =

16th century ruler of Hadiya

- Garad

Governor of Hadiya
- Reign: late 1500s
- Born: Hadiya Sultanate
- Religion: Islam
- Occupation: state leader

Aze was the Garad (chief) of the Hadiya seven houses which consisted of Siltʼe, Wolane, Ulbarag, Azernet, Barbare, Wuriro, and Gadabano, speakers of Semitic Harari language. He was de facto ruler of the Hadiya state.

== Militant career ==
During the reign of Emperor Sarsa Dengel of Ethiopia, Aze initiated a revolt after killing the Abyssinian administrator Rom Sagad in Hadiya which led to his defeat at the Battle of Hadiya in 1569.

== See also ==
- Sidi Mohammed
