= Habtamu =

Habtamu is an Ethiopian male given name. Its meaning in Amharic can be translated as "my wealth".

Notable people with the name include:

- Habtamu Dagne, Ethiopian academic
- Habtamu de Hoop, Dutch politician
- Habtamu Fikadu (born 1988), Ethiopian long-distance runner
- Habtamu Wondimu, Ethiopian academic

== See also: notable people with Habtamu as the name of the father include ==
- Atsede Habtamu (born 1987), Ethiopian long-distance runner

== See also: variants of the name ==
- Habte, variation of the name
- Habtom, variation of the name
