= Battle of Embabo =

1882 conflict in Ethiopia between Shewan and Gojjam forces

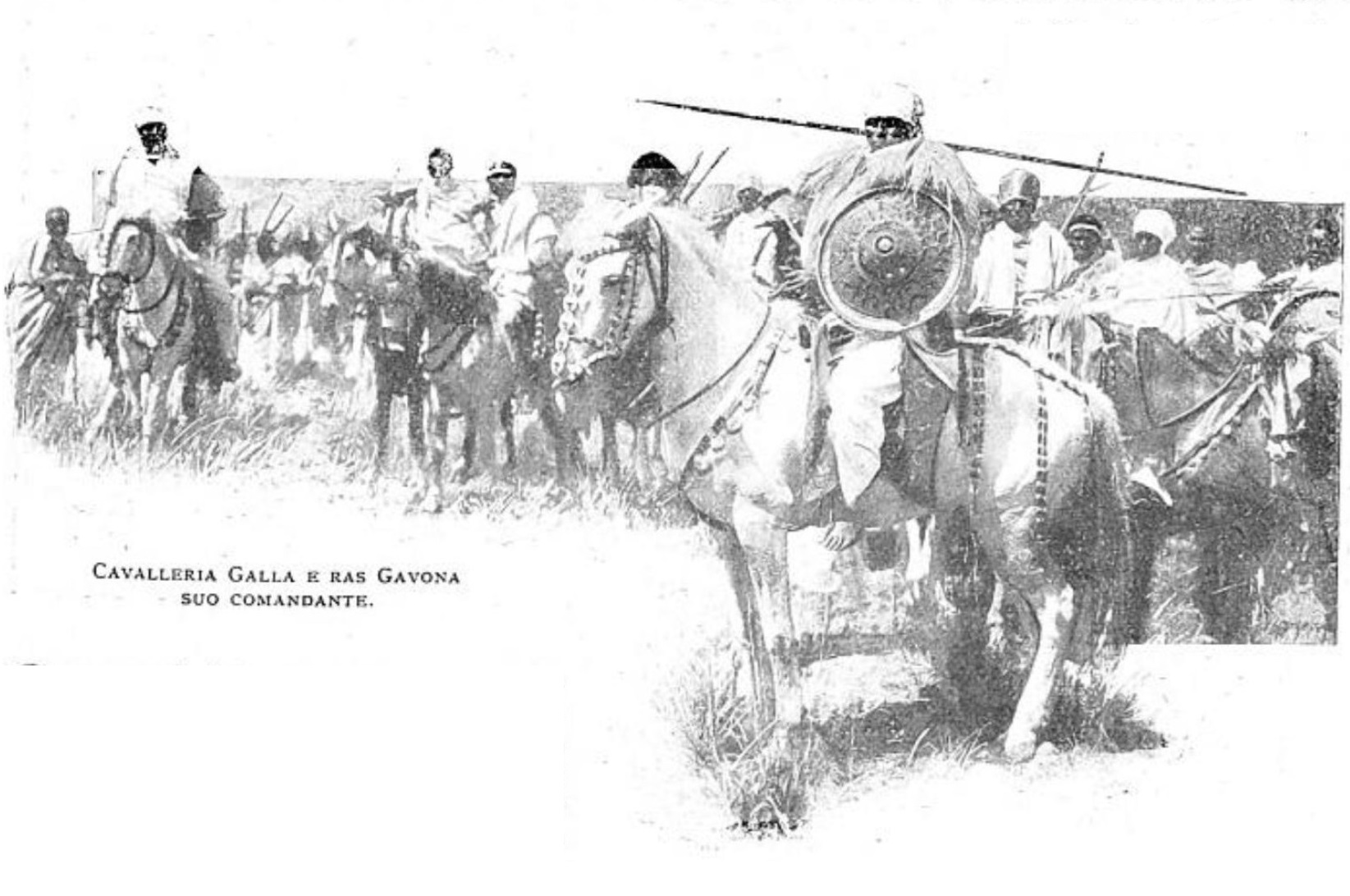
- Illustration of ras Gobana Dacche and his Oromo cavalry
Date	6 June 1882
Location	Embabo, Ethiopia 09°44′05″N 37°33′55″E
Result	Shewan victory

Belligerents
Shewa	Gojjam

Commanders and leaders
Negus Menelik; Ras Gobana; Queen Mestawat of Wollo	Negus Tekle Haymanot; Ras Darasu

Casualties and losses
913 killed and 1,648 wounded	929 killed and 1,738 wounded 4,000 prisoners and 6 cannons captured

The Battle of Embabo was fought 6 June 1882, between the Shewan forces of Negus (Note: Roughly equivalent to King.) Menelik and the Gojjame forces of Negus Tekle Haymanot. The forces fought to gain control over Wallaga and Kaffa provinces south of the Blue Nile (Abay). The Gojjame forces under Tekle Haymanot were defeated. This is one of the three battles (along with Chelenqo and Adwa) which Donald Donham lists that led to Shewan supremacy over the rest of Ethiopia.

== Background ==
South of Gojjam, across the Abay River, and southwest of Shewa, lay the fertile Gibe region and the gold deposits beyond. Both polities craved control of these resources in order to assert dominance over the rest of Ethiopia. Of the two, the Gojjame had the earlier start and better position: as early as 1810, a large volume of luxury trade passed North through Gojjam (and its major market at Boso) to the coast of the Red Sea, far more than passed east through Shewa to the coast. Negus Bofo of Limmu-Ennarea maintained good relations with the contemporary governor of Gojjam. A letter survives from his son Abba Bagibo to Dejazmach Goshu Zewde, seeking an alliance against a mutual foe.

The armies of Shewa and Gojjam had clashed earlier in 1882. The Shewan was led by Ras Gobana Dacche, and the Gojjame by Ras Darrasu, a deputy of Negus Tekle Haymanot; Ras Gobana had forced his opponent to surrender the tribute he was bringing back to Tekle Haymanot. Humiliated, Tekle Haymanot exchanged angry words with his peer, Menelik II, which resulted with the two potentates leading their armies to face one another at Embabo near the Guder River.

== Battle ==
The battle began at 10:00 am with the Gojjame cannons firing at the enemy. The guns of both sides did little damage, and soon were inoperable. After a volley of rifle fire, soldiers on both sides charged and engaged their opponents in what Harold G. Marcus describes as "a fierce day-long battle of hand-to-hand combat, with both kings participating as ordinary soldiers". Late in the afternoon the Gojjame center collapsed, and Tekle Haymanot was wounded then captured. The troops under his son, Ras Bezzabbeh, surrendered and were taken prisoner. Although Ras Darrasu continued to fight, a cavalry charge led by Ras Gobana on his flank ended their resistance, and the battle was over. More than half the Gojjame force was lost during the battle. The Shewans suffered 913 killed and 1,648 wounded.

== Aftermath ==
"In victory Menelik was prepared to be magnanimous", Marcus states. Menelik allowed the common soldiers to return to their farms and plough their lands before the rainy season. For his vital role in the conflict, Menelik awarded Ras Gobana the governorship of the Gibe region.

However, there was one exception to Menelik's magnanimity. According to Oromo tradition, Tekle Haymanot had been captured by a slave named Sambato, who did not know the identity of his prisoner. Ras Mangasha Atikam did recognize Sambato's prisoner, bought his captive for ten Maria Theresa thalers, and led him to Ras Gobana's tent. Gobana, on seeing the Negus, called to him in Amharic, "Gojjame, bring me the plate!" – responding to a boast Tekle Haymanot had made before the two armies had clashed: "After the battle, Ras Gobana will carry my mitad [baking tray] back to Gojjam." Sambato also received his freedom and was made a fitawrari for capturing the enemy negus.

However, Emperor Yohannes IV, their overlord, was outraged at his two vassals openly at war with each other and marched to Were Ilu, just inside Menelik's borders, where he demanded the release of Tekle Haymanot and his family. There the Emperor hammered out a compromise: Yohannes would take Agawmeder from Negus Tekle Haymanot and Wollo from Negus Menelik; Menelik would surrender the arms he captured to Yohannes's lieutenant Ras Alula Engida; and a peace was cemented with several dynastic marriages, including Negus Menelik to the daughter of a noble family from the Emperor's own domain, Taitu Betul.

== See also ==
Menelik II's conquests

== Notes ==
Footnotes

Citations
