= Fatagar =

1400–1650 province in the Horn of Africa

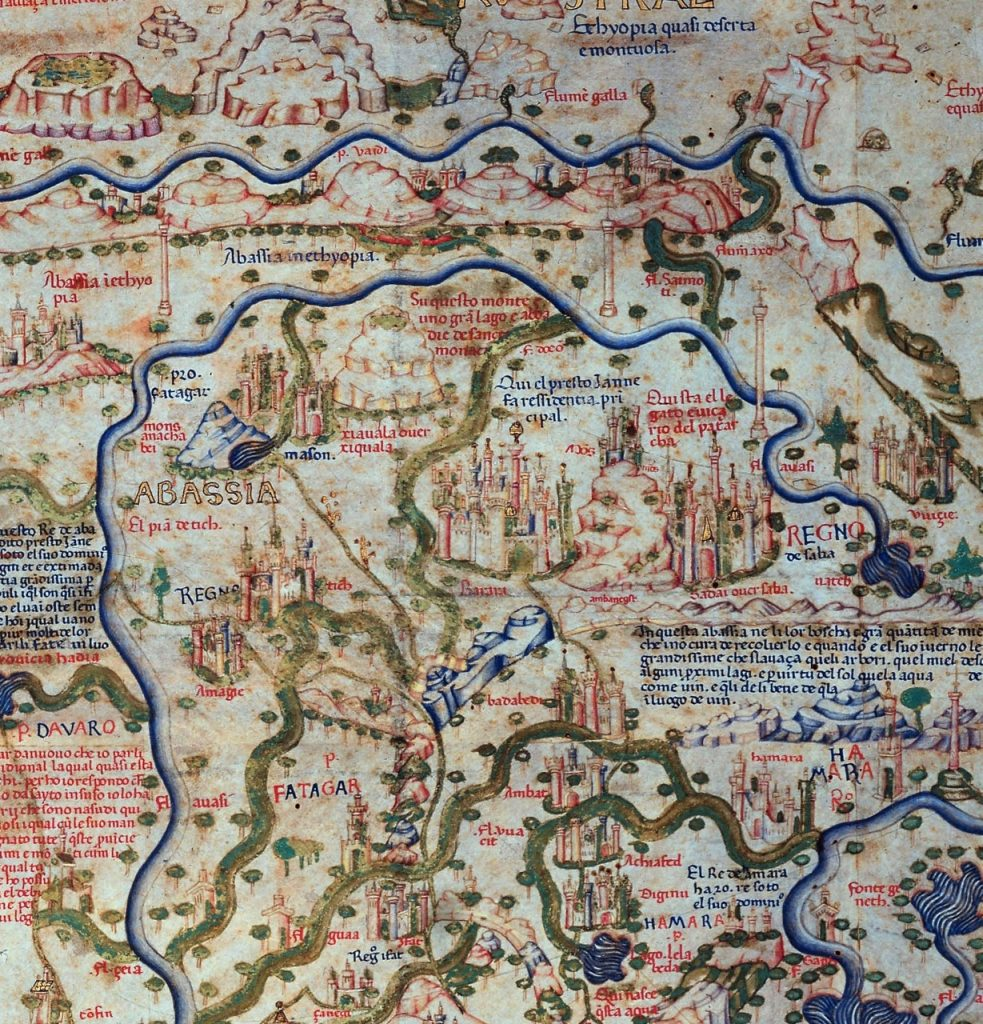
A medieval map of Fatagar and surrounding areas

Fatagar (Amharic: ፈጠጋር Faṭagār) was a historical province that separated Muslim and Christian dominions in the medieval Horn of Africa. In the eleventh century it was part of the Muslim states, then was invaded by the Christian kingdom led by Emperor Amda Seyon I, after which it would serve as central district in, and home of multiple rulers of, the Ethiopian Empire in the 15th century.

== Location ==
In the 1560's Fatagar operated by alternating between two Centres: Dembiya and Oda Nabi. Fatagar separated Ifat from Shewa and was south of the kingdom of Lasta bounded by the region of Endagabatan in the north west. It is also described as having been located in eastern Ethiopia, where several kingdoms, such as Ifat, Mora, Dawaro, Hadiya and Bale, also existed. The area is now part of modern Shewa southeast of Addis Ababa.

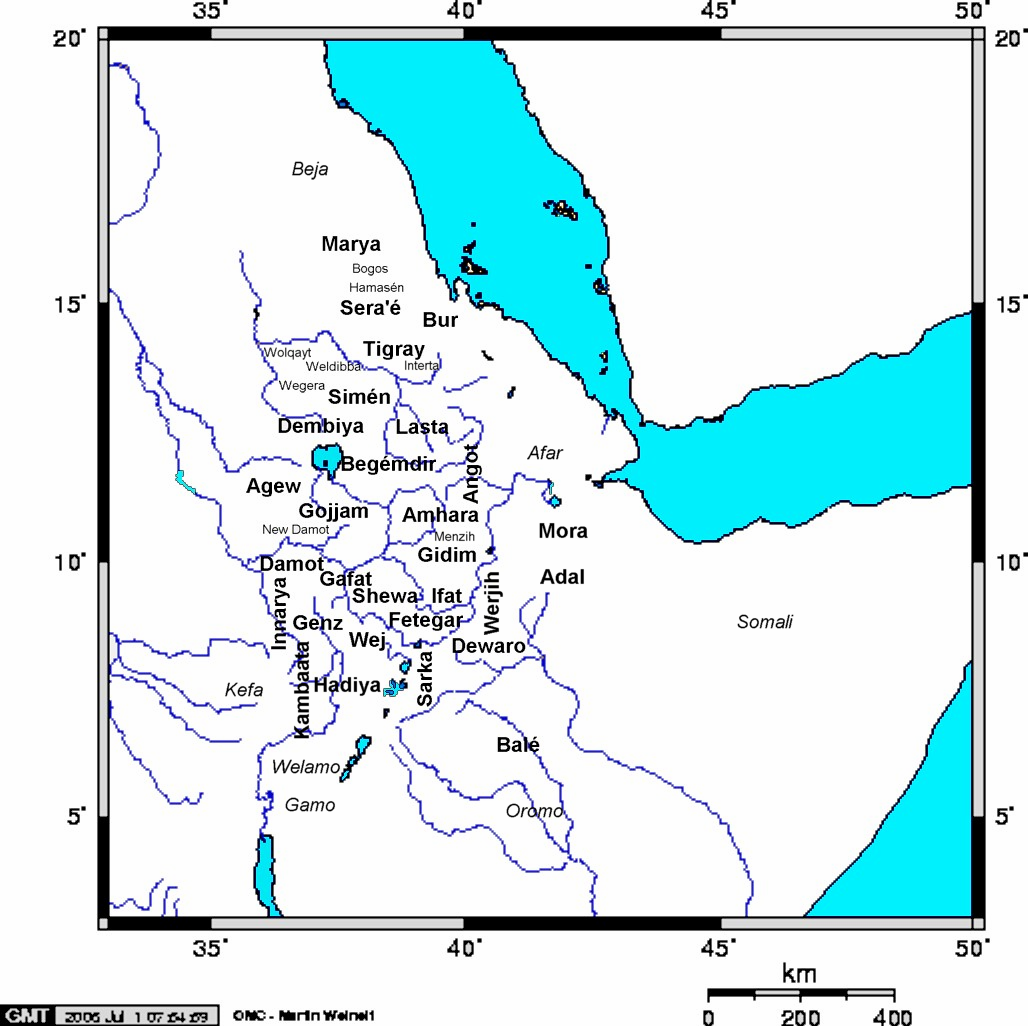
Map of medieval Ethiopian provinces, with Fetegar between Ifat and Shewa, and west of Wej, northeast of Hadiya, and north of Dawaro

== Early history ==
=== Establishment and early campaigns ===
Fatagar was founded during the arrival of Islam in Eastern Ethiopia in the early 10th century, along with other confederates of Zeila such as Adal, Ifat, Shewa, Mora and Dawaro. It was a large province and one of Ifat's strongest allies; the latter used it as leverage against the rest of Ethiopia, since in order to get to Ifat, the Ethiopian Empire had to go through several other kingdoms, including Fatagar. Ifat sent governors and advisors to the sultanate to lead their Muslim allies.

=== Conquest ===
The Abyssinian Emperor Amda Seyon I attacked the Muslim states surrounding his Ethiopian Empire, conquering all of them and making them tributaries in his royal court, with Fatagar falling alongside Ifat, Dawaro, Bale, Wej and many others. One ruler of Fatagar, Ras Azmach Islamo, earned his name by fighting fellow Muslims, among other notable deeds.

=== Jarecho (Zway era) ===
Another noted ruler was Ras Amdu from the Zway dynasty of Wej; according to one chronicle, his reputation was enough to dissuade the Abyssinians from invading Fatagar. The chronicle records this statement: "Let us also have the protection of the Muslims in order to achieve our aims, and bring them in so that our religion may not be changed. But there is a Garad (Ras) Amdu, and as long as he lives the Muslims are weak and scared." This would lead to them plotting against him and planning to spread a rumour that the King slept with Queen Eleni of Abyssinia. With this Amdu was furious and led an army from Wej to Fetegar, and also campaigned against the Maya. Amdu invaded Fetegar and several other kingdoms, decisively defeating the Moslims; however, in his campaign, the Abyssinian king Eskender came to the support of the Muslims. Eskender captured Amdu and killed him. Amdu's nephew Welde Sulis succeeded Amdu; when he met Eskender he swore an oath not to spare him.

After the death of Amdu, Fatagar served an important role for the Ethiopian Empire. Dawit I and his successors stayed in Fatagar for a long time in Tobya (Ifat, Fatagar). The kingdom served as the birthplace of the future emperors Zara Yaqob, Eskender. Emperor Na'od would then make Tobya and Zway his capital. During most of the medieval period Fatagar suffered raids by Adal Sultanate and their affiliate states.

== Later history ==
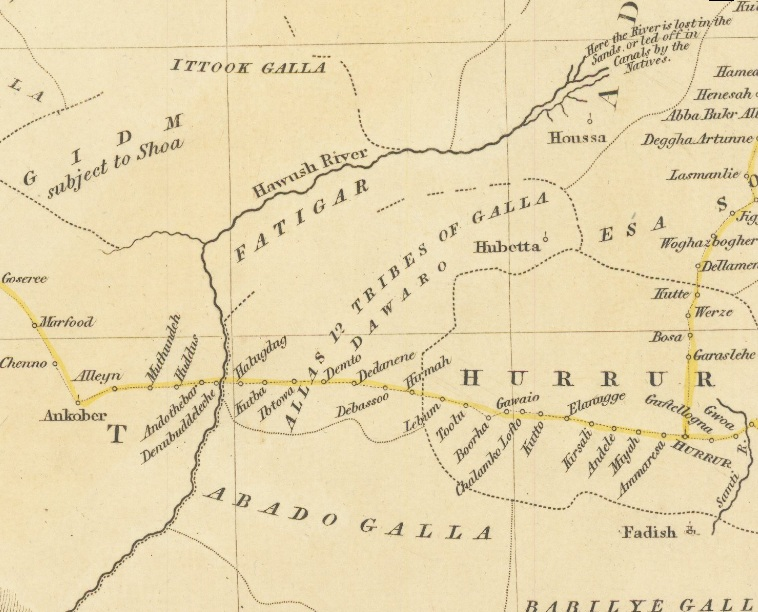
Map of Fatagar region near the Awash River in 1817

Following emperor Na'od's defeat by Imam Mahfuz, the Adalites briefly controlled Fatagar until the reign of emperor Dawit II, who would recapture the territories for the Abyssinians. Later, in the mid 16th century, Fatagar was again invaded by the Imam of Harar, Ahmad ibn Ibrahim. When he died one of his generals, Garad Abbas, did not follow his orders and invaded Fatagar. He would invade many kingdoms, but his campaign was stopped by the Emperor Gelawdewos. After the death of Garad Abbas, Gelawdewos invaded all of the Muslim provinces and kingdoms except for Harar. Among the kingdoms he conquered were Dawaro, Fatagar, Bali, and Hadiya. The Ethiopian king then focused on the southwestern side of Ethiopia, and there, Nur ibn Mujahid found an opportunity for jihad. Nur invaded Bale and Dawaro. He planned to invade Fatagar next, but the Ethiopian Govorner Fanu’el decisively defeated Nur in the year 1550. However, the war did not end there. Ras Fanu’el campaigned further into Muslim territory and pushed the Harari Army back to Adal. The Ethiopian Govorner raided Muslim territories and took many goods. Nur took a lot of damage in his first campaign; it took him nine years to recover, but he then got together an army of 1800 horsemen and 500 riflemen and numerous sword and bow men, and invaded Fatagar. Gelawdewos saw Nur as a threat so he sent Hamalmal, Governor of Kambata, and Ras Fasil to destroy Harar. What he did not know was that Nur was campaigning in Kaffa. The two Governors sacked Harar. After finding out that Nur had marched to Fatagar, Gelawdewos led his army to Nech Sar. The two armied met on March 23, 1559, at the Battle of Fatagar, and it is said that a Harari rifleman shot the monarch, but he kept on fighting. A group of Harari cavalry then attacked him and he was killed.

== Inhabitants ==
The now extinct Maya ethnic group once inhabited Fatagar. According to Guinean historian Djibril Niane, it is probable that the Argobba, Wolane, Silt'e, and Harari peoples also inhabited this region.
