= Sharkha =

Ancient province of Ethiopia

Sharkha (also transliterated as Sharka, Sharha, Xarha, Xerha, Xarkhah) was a province of the Ethiopian Empire in the southern part of its realm. Its inhabitants were predominantly Muslim, and similar in customs, economic conditions, and ethnic affiliations to its neighboring provinces of Hadiya, Oromo and Arababni.

According to the research of Ulrich Braukämper, the written sources allow one to determine only "that it was bordered by Hadiya, Dawaro, and Bale." Interviews with local Oromo and Hadiya, however, revealed they identified Sharka with "Širk in eastern Arsiland, to which the traditions of many Alaba and East Gurage refer to as their former dwelling areas."

== History ==
This earliest mention of this province is in the Royal Chronicle of Emperor Amda Seyon. During his reign, the governor of this province, Yusuf, was accused of cooperating with the Muslims of Dawaro against the Ethiopian army. As his army passed through Dawaro, Amda Seyon led a punitive expedition against Sharka, plundering its land, which was rich in livestock, and capturing Yusuf. The historians Chihab al-Umari and al-Maqrizi simply mention the length of Sharka was three days and its breadth four, and its army could muster 3,000 cavalrymen and twice that many foot soldiers. Along with Dawaro and Arababni, Sharka made use of small pieces of iron called hakuna, which served as primitive money.

The next time Sharka is mentioned is in the Futuh al-Habasha, the history of the conquests of Imam Ahmed ibn Ibrahim al-Ghazi. At that time Sharka was administered by an Ethiopian governor named Limu. In 1531, the Imam sent the vizir 'Addoli to raid Ganbah, which is described as "above Sharka". Ten of his horsemen continued on to Sharka, where they encountered Fit Betuadad Badlai, who had 50 cavalry and 500 footmen with him, blocking their advance. Despite being outnumbered, the ten horsemen charged the forces of the Fit Betuadad and scattered them, taking two Ethiopians prisoner and much booty. When the Muslim horsemen returned to Imam Ahmad, he sent vizir 'Addoli to take the vizir Nur with him and raid Sharka a second time. which led to the capture of the wives and children of the Ethiopians who had been with Fit Betuadad Badlai and much booty. Sharkha was then governed by Siddiq b. Ali of Adal.

The last reference to Sharka is in the Royal Chronicle of Emperor Sarsa Dengel, who marched through Wag and Sharka in 1577 on his way to attack the army of Harar. The Portuguese travellers of the 16th and 17th centuries are not familiar with Sharka, which leads to the assumption that it had vanished as a political unit by the 17th century.
