= Battle of Endagabatan =

Date	1563
Location	Endagabatan, Ethiopia (north west of Fatagar)
Result	Ethiopian Imperial victory: Revolt suppressed; Hamalmal reconciles with Emperor Sarsa Dengel

Belligerents
Ethiopian Empire; Islamic state of Wej	Rebels

Commanders and leaders
Dejazmach Taklo; Garad Asmadin	Dejazmach Hamalmal

Strength
Unknown Abyssinan Imperial troops 800 Wej Cavalry	500 Cavalry, and unknown foot soldiers

Casualties and losses
Unknown	Unknown

The Battle of Endagabatan was fought in the year 1563 between the forces of the Ethiopian Empire led by Dejazmach Taklo, and rebels under Dejazmach Hamalmal.

== Battle ==
Hamalmal led a revolt against his cousin, the Emperor of Ethiopia Sarsa Dengel. Hamalmal barricaded his forces at Endagabatan in preparation for an offensive. Largely outnumbered by Hamalmal's rebels, the Emperor's able general Taklo successfully received assistance from the Malassay Muslim Garad Asmadin of Wej. The revolt was suppressed after a series of victories by the imperial troops which led to Hamalmal requesting clemency from the Emperor.
