= Mugar River =

Tributary river in central Ethiopia

Mugar River Muger, Mujer
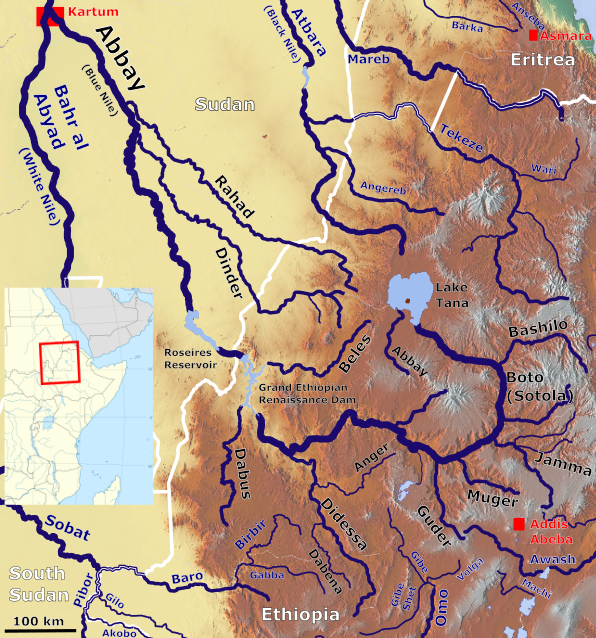
- Map showing the Abbay (Blue Nile) basin, with the Mugar River (bottom right)

Location
- Country: Ethiopia

Physical characteristics
- Mouth: Blue Nile
  - coordinates: 9.918069°N 37.930343°E
  - elevation: 979 m (3,212 ft)
- Basin size: 8,188 km^{2} (3,161 sq mi)

Basin features
- Progression: Blue Nile → Nile → Mediterranean Sea
- River system: Nile Basin

The Mugar River (or Mujer) is a north-flowing tributary of the Abay River in central Ethiopia, which is notable for its deep gorge. Tributaries of the Muger include the Labbu. The Muger has a drainage area of about 8,188 square kilometers. It was bounded by the historical Endagabatan province.

The Mugar is important as a landmark because it marked the eastern boundary of the kingdom of Damot (before the Great Oromo migration forced that people across the Abay) and the western one of the district of Selale. Somewhere in the Guder-Mugar valleys, the first recorded dinosaur fossil in the Horn of Africa was discovered in 1976. It was a single tooth of a carnosaur.

The region around Mugar was the traditional territory of the now extinct Gafat people however they would be expelled by Amhara emperors in the following centuries and later assimilated by the Oromo people.

== See also ==
- List of rivers of Ethiopia
