= Battle of Hadiya (1569) =

1569 Ethiopian Empire battle

Date	1569
Location	Hadiya (south of the upper Awash River)
Result	Decisive Ethiopian victory: Hadiya is reannexed; Aze maintains nominal rule over Hadiya

Belligerents
Hadiya Sultanate; Sultanate of Harar	Ethiopian Empire

Commanders and leaders
Garad Aze of Hadiya	Emperor Sarsa Dengel

Strength
1,700 cavalry (non combatants); Large infantry (non combatants); 500 Malassay	Unknown

Casualties and losses
Heavy; Entire Malassay force annihilated	Minimal

The Battle of Hadiya was fought between the forces of the Hadiya led by their Garad (chief) Aze, and the Ethiopian Empire under Emperor Sarsa Dengel. The Hadiya ruler had refused to pay tribute to the Ethiopian emperor, which lead to the conflict.

== Battle ==
Emir Uthman of Harar dispatched 500 Malassay warriors donned in cuirasses to assist Hadiya however Aze's own men, who were large in number, refused to fight the invading Ethiopian army. Hadiya soldiers cited their refusal as being due to already having sustained heavy casualties during the Oromo migrations. The Malassay of Harar, finding themselves alone in battle, were thus easily defeated by the Ethiopian forces.

== See also ==
Battle of Hadiya (1600s)
