= Asmadin =

General in the Adal Sultanate

Asmadin was a Malassay of the Adal Sultanate and later Garad (governor) in Abyssinia. He remained in Ethiopia as governor of Wej province after Adal's defeat and subsequent military withdrawal from Abyssinian territory. Asmadin had a great deal of influence in Abyssinia as he is known for assisting the imperial forces of Emperor Sarsa Dengel at the Battle of Endagabatan and the Battle of Webi River. A gate is named after him in the city of Harar called Asmadin Bari.
