= Bale Province =

Bale Province may refer to:

- Balé Province, Burkina Faso
- Bale Province, Ethiopia
