= Hassan Enjamo =

Leader of Hadiya (died 1889)

- imam, Garad

Governor of Hadiya
- Reign: early 1800s–1889
- Predecessor: Umar Bekessa
- Born: Ennamor
- Died: 1889; Saba, Qabeena
- Religion: Islam
- Occupation: leader of Hadiya

Hassan Enjamo was a chief of the Hadiya people in the nineteenth century. He was the last Garad of Qabena before the Abyssinian invasion.

== Early life ==
Born to a Hadiya Qabena chief father, Walga Mooe and a Gurage mother.

== Political and militant career ==
Imam Hassan's state dominated modern day southern Ethiopia in the 1800s through expansion towards all of Hadiya, Gurage and some parts of Oromo territory, Islamizing most of the population by 1876. Hassan would extend invitations to Islamic scholars from Ifat to engage in proselytization efforts within his realm. According to Ethiopian historian Lapiso Gedelebo, Hassan ruled the region amidst two rivers; Omo and the Awash.

For two years beginning from 1886, the attempted Abyssinian Shewa expansion led by Menelik II was pushed back by Hassan's militia. Hassan had obtained the support of local Gurage, Wolane, Silt'e, Arsi Oromo and other Muslims in the region. Several nobles from neighboring states such as the brother of Abba Jifar II the ruler of the Kingdom of Jimma backed Hassan's troops. However Abba Jifar himself refused, replying to Hassan's request in joining him for jihad with the following: "I am not a soldier of holy wars and in my country there are no zawaya".

It is believed his resistance was inspired by the Sudanese Mahdist State akin to that of the Talha Jafar-led Muslim revolt in Wollo.

== Death ==
Hassan's followers were finally defeated in 1889 by the Abyssinian forces led by Ras Gobana Dacche. Although Hassan was able to flee to the Kingdom of Jimma following the battle, he would soon succumb to malaria in 1889 upon his return to Qabeena.

== See also ==
- Sidi Mohammed
