= Gudar River =

River in central Ethiopia

Gudar River Guder
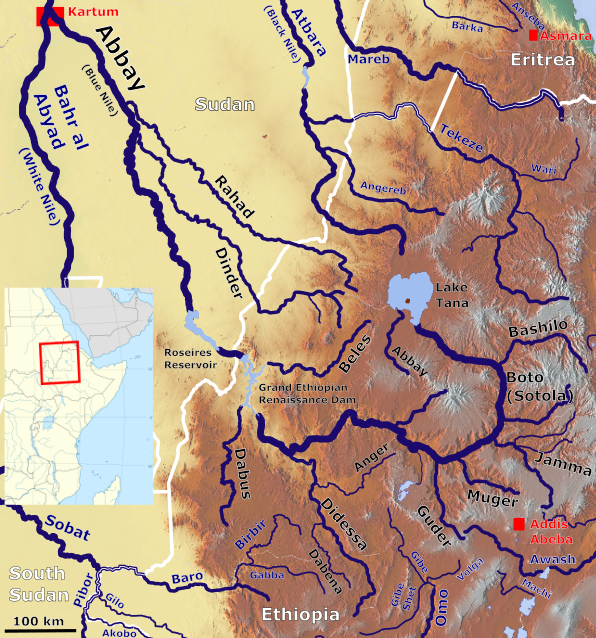
- Map showing the Abbay (Blue Nile) basin, with the Gudar River (bottom right)

Location
- Country: Ethiopia

Physical characteristics
- Mouth: Blue Nile
  - coordinates: 9.863615°N 37.671039°E
  - elevation: 932 m (3,058 ft)
- Basin size: 7,011 km^{2} (2,707 sq mi)

Basin features
- Progression: Blue Nile → Nile → Mediterranean Sea
- River system: Nile Basin

The Gudar is a river of central Ethiopia. It is a left-bank tributary of the Abay or Blue Nile; tributaries of the Gudar include the Dabissa and the Taranta. The Gudar River has a drainage area about 7,011 square kilometers in size. It was bounded by the historical Endagabatan province.

In the 1600s, emperor Susenyos I and his troops traversed this river to meet Hadiya leader Sidi Mohammed at the Battle of Hadiya.

A Greek resident built the first bridge over the Gudar in 1897.

== See also ==
- List of rivers of Ethiopia
