= Wiil Waal =

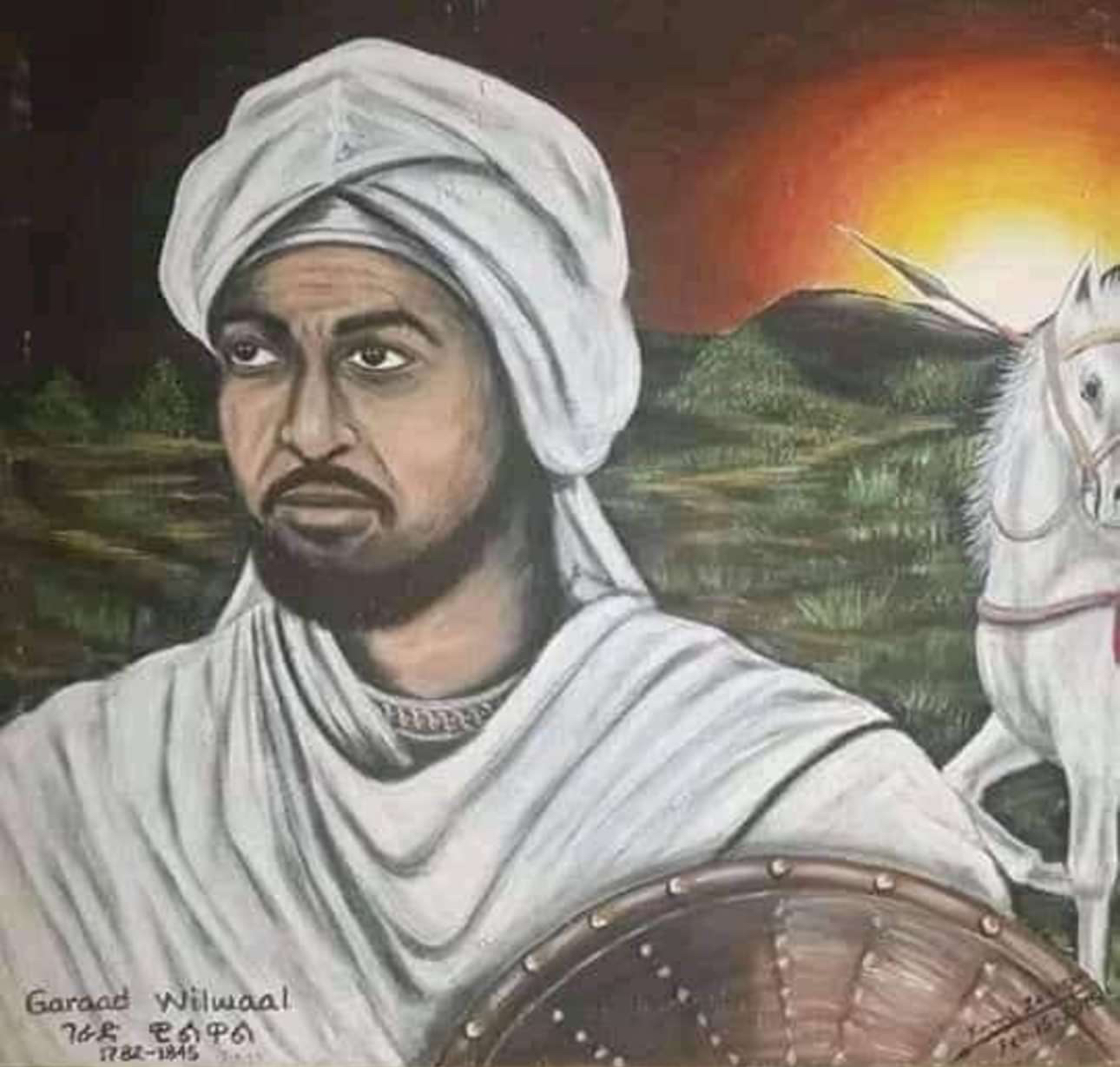
Somali King

Wiil Waal was a Somali ruler and folk hero. He is sometimes identified as a possibly-mythical 16th century sultan but further research linked his story to Farah Garad Hirsi, a historical 19th century chieftain. The nickname Wiil Waal literally translates to "crazy boy" from Somali. British explorer Richard Francis Burton noted many reports of Hirsi: "some described him as cruel, violent, and avaricious; others spoke of him as a godly and a prayerful person."

A bilingual children's book was written about him in English and Somali and published by the Minnesota Department of Humanities.

The Jijiga Gerad Wilwal Airport in Jijiga, Ethiopia is named after him.
