= Maya (East Africa) =

Extinct Ethiopian ethnic group

The Maya are an extinct ethnic group native to Wej province in Ethiopia. The Mayas were a Cushitic-speaking nomadic pastoralist people, primarily cattle herders. They were known by neighboring groups for their use of poisoned arrows. By the end of the 16th century the Mayas were overrun by the Oromo, after which they disappear from the historical record either by physical extermination or assimilation. According to professor Ulrich Braukämper, the Maya were related to the Hadiyya.

== History ==
An ancient Cushitic-speaking pagan group, the Maya inhabited the area on the eastern edge of the Kingdom of Damot, which was an old place of contention between the local non-Christian rulers and the Christian monarchy of the Zagwe Dynasty, possibly under the control of the Christian state as early as the 10th century. It has been speculated that some of the stone monuments in the current Soddo region of Gurage may recall the ancient presence of the Maya or their predecessors in the area. Some monuments are inscribed with swords, while others display bows and arrows.

During the 14th and 15th centuries, as part of Wej, the Maya region remained predominantly pagan under its own rulers but was subject to the Christian monarchy, which regularly drafted Maya regiments to fight for the Ethiopian kingdom. The Maya lived near a church on Mount Zuqualla which was founded by abba Gebre Menfes Kidus. According to the 15th-century itineraries collected by Alessandro Zorzi, Wej was known as an area governed by a queen, with the Maya listed as part of the region. A 1454 map depicts the Maya as "strong men". In 1448/49, Emperor Zara Yaqob resettled some Maya as a military colony (Chewa) in Eritrea. For the next two centuries, the Maya were primarily known as a formidable fighting force, with poison arrows among their key weapons. References to Maya place names near Harar and in Begemder near Lake Tana suggest they served as soldiers and were established in military colonies under several kings. Although they generally maintained good relations with the monarchy, the Maya were allegedly responsible for the death of Emperor Eskender in 1494.

According to sixteenth century Arab writer Arab Faqih, the Mayan territory was situated south of the Awash River and extended west towards Mount Zuqualla in Abyssinia. Although Ahmad ibn Ibrahim instructed his troops not to provoke the Maya by taking their cattle, his armies had already clashed with a 3,000-strong Maya force during the early years of the conflict. Arab Faqih described the Maya as "infidels" and "polytheists" who used poisoned arrows. Ultimately, the Maya were defeated by a certain Farasahamdin, who converted their leader and a significant portion of the population to Islam. Farasahamdin was appointed governor of the region, and from then on, the Maya fought on the Muslim side.

The Maya homeland of Wej was one of the first lands to be invaded during the Oromo migrations. The Maya repelled the weight of the Oromo for years due to their skill with the bow, until the Oromo armies changed tactics and used thick oxhide shields and fixed shield formations. In 1574, after finding out the Oromo had conquered the province of Wej, Emperor Sarsa Dengel gathered his forces from throughout Ethiopia to form an army at Gindberet. From there, Sarsa Dengel headed south, where he found that the Oromo had overrun the lands of the Maya.

They were for the last time documented as auxiliaries for the Ethiopian Emperor Susenyos I.

== Notable people ==
Malik Ambar (1548 – 1626) was born as a Maya under the birth name Chapu.
