= Gobana Dacche =

Ethiopian military commander

Gobena Dacche
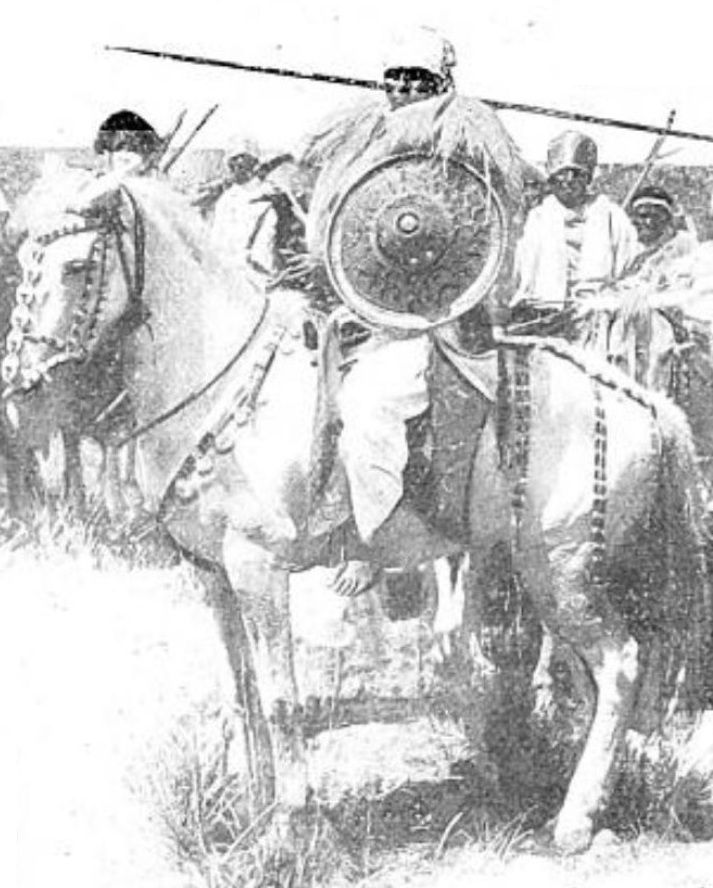
- Ras Gobana Dacche on horseback
- Born: c. 1821
- Died: July 1889

Ras Gobena Dache (Amharic: ራስ ጎበና ዳጬ Oromo: Goobanaa Daaccee; c. 1821 – July 1889) was an Ethiopian military commander under Menelik II and during his reign. An ethnic Oromo, he is known for campaigning against Oromo territory to incorporate more lands into the Ethiopian Empire in the late 19th century.

== History ==
Gobena's son Wedajo was married to Menelik's daughter Shoarega who bore him, a grandson, Wasan Seged Wedajo, whom Menelik saw as his successor, and had him raised at the court as if heir to the throne. Wedajo opposed the court education of his son and this dispute over child custody led to the divorce of his wife. This grandson of Menelik II was eliminated from the succession due to dwarfism.

=== Southern expansion ===
Ras Gobena (earlier Dejazmach Gobena) became a famed chief who was close to the Aba Mudda, a spiritual head of the Oromo. He gained support among various Oromo clans, and he led the western and southern military movement of Menelik II. According to historian Donald Levine, Ras Gobena did most of the southern expansion that incorporated more Oromo speaking peoples into Menelik's Ethiopian Empire, helped by Oromo soldiers that were led by various famous Oromo chiefs like Moroda Bekere. In addition to Oromo communities, Ras Gobena defeated the militias of southern ethnic Sidama and Qabena communities. Upon defeating the Muslim Hadiya leader Hassan Enjamo, the Shewan army led by Ras Gobena subsequently ravaged Qabena, Silt'e, Chaha and other Muslim settlements as well as dividing their land between the Neftenya which accompanied his army. On 14 October 1888, the allied forces of Ras Gobena and Moroda Bekere defeated the Mahdist Sudanese invasion of the Welega Oromo at the Battle of Guté Dili.

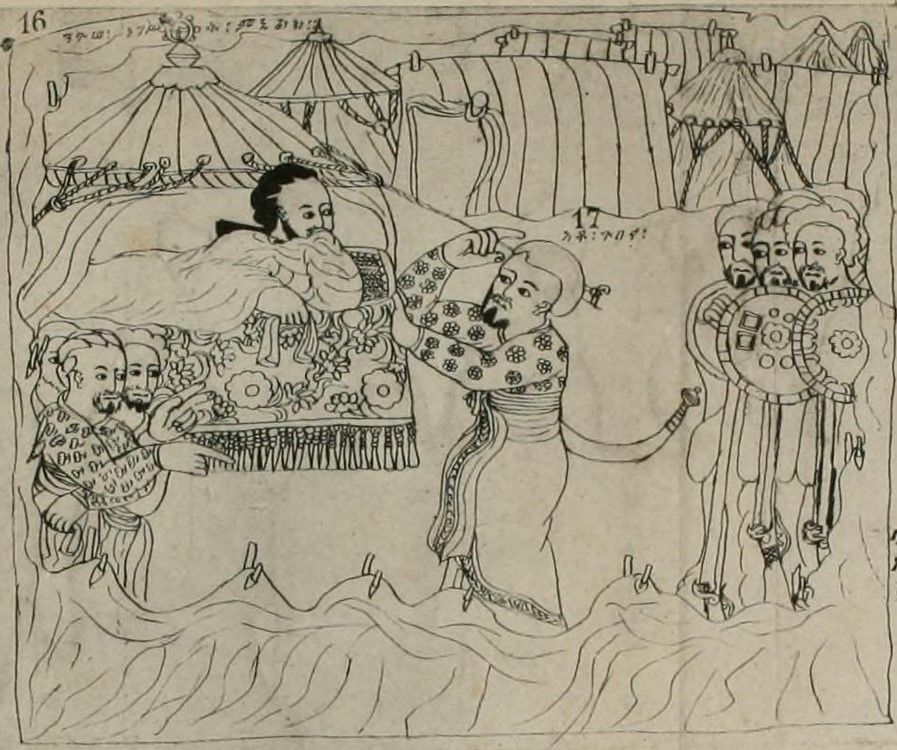
Menelik II hosting Gobana, c. 1880

Some of the southern communities militarily opposed Ras Gobana's army throughout his campaigns, while others, particularly the kingdoms in the Gibe region, embraced the alliance with Ras Gobena and Menelik II, who later became the Emperor of Ethiopia. Despite the opposition, historian Donald Levine states that some southern Oromo supported Ras Gobana and the Ethiopian centralization was "welcomed as a way to put an end" to "intertribal fighting" between the Oromo communities. During the conquest of southern territories, Menelik's Army carried out mass atrocities against his opponents in battle including mutilation, killings and large scale slavery.

The two most important historical figures who signify the introduction of the concepts of national boundary and sovereignty in Ethiopia are Emperor Menelik II and Ras Gobana Dache, who used guns manufactured in Europe to bring a large swath of Biyas (regions/nations) under a centralized rule.

== Popular culture ==
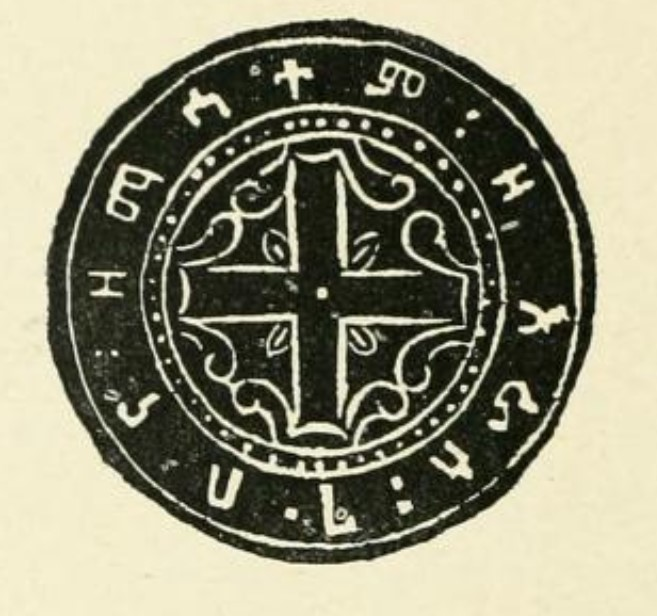
Gobana's seal

The sentiment of most Ethiopians toward Ras Gobana often correlates to 21st century Ethiopian politics. Ras Gobana is a controversial figure for some Oromo nationalists who think he was a traitor for allying with the Northern Ethiopians to conquer some southern regions. Mohammed Hassan translates the following song as an example of Oromo expression that Gobana betrayed his own people:

It is strange, it is strange, it is strange,

women do not raid houses;
she who gives birth to a dog is strange.
Relatives do not hurt each other,
the haft of an axe is strange
people of one stock do not sell each other

that of the son of Dacche is strange

Though many Oromo communities battled and conquered each other for centuries, some contemporary Oromo politicians who favor ethno-political mobilization toward Oromo unity often associate Oromo opposition to them as a betrayal act similar to that of the 19th century Ras Gobana and other Oromo leaders who allied with the Amhara and Tigray. And those Oromos who associated with Ethiopian governments of the past, including Derg and the Selassie Monarch are sometimes labeled "neo-Goobanaas." In contrast, other Ethiopians who advocate Ethiopian unity and who oppose ethnocentric political movements often glorify Ras Gobana as an Ethiopian hero and as a unifying figure.
