= Bale revolt =

Guerrilla war in Ethiopia, 1963–1970

- Part of the Ethiopian–Somali conflict, Opposition to Haile Selassie and Conflicts in the Horn of Africa
- Location of Bale within the Ethiopian Empire
Date	1963–1970
Location	Bale Province, Ethiopia
Result	Ethiopian victory

Belligerents
Ethiopian Empire; Supported by (since 1968): United States; United Kingdom	Oromo and Somali rebels Supported by (1963–1969): (Somalia) Somali Republic

Commanders and leaders
Haile Selassie I Jagama Kello	Waqo Gutu; Halimo Waqo; Adam Jillo; Halima Hassan; Haala Korme

Casualties and losses
Unknown	Approx. 700,000 casualties including both insurgents and civilians (Per Asafa Jalata)

The Bale revolt, also known as the Bale Peasant Movement, was an insurgency that took place in the 1960s in the southeastern Ethiopian province of Bale among the local Oromo and Somali populations. The revolt targeted the feudalist system in place during the Ethiopian Empire and was rooted in ethnic and religious grievances.

Initially acts of resistance began in 1962 and 1963 as a defensive reaction by peasants to land expropriation, bureaucratic corruption, and exorbitant taxation imposed by the government. However, further clashes and consequent government reprisals eventually transformed the peasants into a decentralized insurgency that would go on to wage a six-year long guerrilla war, ending in 1970.

Support from the Somali government that had begun in 1963 was integral to the insurgency's ability to sustain combat operations.

== Background ==
=== Bale Province ===
Bale province is a large administrative region in southeastern Ethiopia, possessing a highly varied topography ranging from forests to large mountain ranges. The province is primarily composed of the Oromo and Somali peoples who overwhelmingly adhere to Islam. Common faith provided a basis for cooperation when the insurgency would break out in 1963.

== Origins ==
=== Amhara resettlement and taxation ===
Serious discontent initially began in response to what the Somali and Oromo populations perceived as exploitation by the Ethiopian government. The government had begun a process of resettlement in Bale province using Amhara settlers from Shewa, who were overwhelmingly Christian. The use of northern settlers to secure southern regions of the empire was a tactic that was used extensively in the 10th to 16th centuries of the Abyssinian Empire and during the reign of Menelik. This resettlement policy consequently resulted in a shortage of arable land in Bale due to land expropriation. The best land in the region eventually became owned by Amharas and higher officials in the province were disproportionately Christian, greatly incensing the Muslim Oromo/Somali population. The rebels aimed to wipe out the domination of the Amhara settlers known as the Neftenya.

Taxation by the imperial government was also widely viewed as exorbitant and unjust by the population of Bale further inflaming rebellious sentiments in the province. A significant increase in land taxes being considered the most aggravating. Professor of African Studies, John Markakis would write of the conditions preceding the revolt:

The legal exactions of the state and the landlords were compounded by a host of illegal impositions levied by the ruling class on the peasantry, usually associated with matters related to land. Land measurement, classification, registration, inheritance, litigation and so on were matters that could be concluded only through the payment of enforced bribes to a series of officials, and were subject to the risk of fraud in the process. Tax payment itself required the running of a gauntlet manned by officials who had to be bribed to conclude the transaction properly. Venality, the hallmark of Ethiopian officialdom throughout the empire, reached its apogee in the conquered areas of the south, where the hapless peasantry had no recourse against it. Northern officials serving in the south hoped to amass a small fortune during their tour of duty, and to acquire land through grant, purchase or other means. The scale of their exploits in Bale affronted even some of their colleagues...There was precious little return for such impositions.

A combination of these government policies are widely considered to be the primary the catalyst of the revolt, as many of the Oromo and Somali peasants would jointly refuse to pay taxes or allow land access to the Ethiopian government.

=== Somali independence ===
In 1960, the colonial territory of British Somaliland and the Italian ruled UN Trusteeship of Somalia merged to form the Somali Republic. Following the union a desire to merge with Somalia developed among the Somali populations of Ethiopia, many of whom resided in Bale province These sentiments were further inflamed by radio broadcasts and arms supplies from Somalia.

== Revolt ==
=== Outbreak (1962 - 1963) ===
Incidents of violence had first begun in 1962, but the trigger for the Bale insurgency was a new head tax introduced in early 1963, leading to the first shots fired in March of that year in the El Kere Awrajja (sub-province). The local population refused to pay both the newly introduced taxes and unpaid taxes from previous years. Kahin Abdi, a key figure leading the resistance led attacks on local towns with the help of other resistance leaders. The Ethiopian government attempted to suppress the growing insurgency movement by sending in military forces, but were ineffective. The revolt was led by Oromo leader and rebel figure General Waqo Gutu. Its primary goals were the retention or repossession of land lost to expropriation or resettlement.

Because the insurgency consisted mostly of inexperienced farmers and peasants, it possessed no real centralized politico-military command structure even though General Gutu was widely viewed as the leader. Numerous clusters of rebels around Bale fought under other insurgent leaders such as Adam Jillo, Ali Butta and Haji Kilta. Several of the revolts leaders were women such as Halima Hassan, Haala Korme and Halimo Waqo. Pastoralists from the Ogaden, effected by government restrictions on free movement would also join the insurgency.

Waqo Gutu is believed to have started the rebellion when he received no government aid after a conflict over grazing rights. He then turned to Somalia to supply himself and other rebels with weapons. Due to the significant Somali element of the revolt, the Bale rebels would enjoy the support of the Somali government. In a bid to reduce any potential conflict between Somalis and Oromos in Bale, the government of Somalia would characterize incidents of resistance in Bale as a defensive Jihad against Christian Amhara expansion.

In 1963 a delegation of eight men from the rebels was sent across the Ogaden to Somalia in search of arms. Well received, they obtained eight Carcano M19 (called the Dhombir) rifles and one Thompson submachine gun. Later that year another rebel trip to Somalia brought back additional arms, ammunition, and grenades. Soon additional groups of insurgents began to embark on the long march to Somalia, and the insurgency would gradually gain begin to strengthen. The first shipment from Somalia to the rebels would come in the form of 40 guns.

That same year the Mecha-Tuulama Self-help Association, a movement that would form that core of the future Oromo Liberation Front, would be founded.

==== Battle of Dhombir ====
In one of the landmark battles at Malka Anna near Ganale River in 1963, Oromo insurgents claimed to have brought down two military helicopters using a non-automatic rifle called Dhombir. Hence, the period from 1963 to 1970 is locally known as the Dhombir war after the gun used by the Oromo fighters. The Battle of Dhombir at Malka Anna was critical in that the rebels were able to capture a significant amount of arms, thereby boosting their defensive capabilities.

=== Spread of revolt (1963 - 1965) ===
Serious revolt broke out during a fairly minor incident in the Wabe district of Bale in 1964, after the governor of the region had unsuccessfully attempted to collect taxes with a large police force. This act of defiance to the central government inspired rebellions to pop up elsewhere in the district culminating in the seizure of the town of Belitu by rebel Oromo/Somali forces. Resistance then spread over to neighboring Delo district and by the end of 1965 central Bale was in total revolt and under rebel control.

During the upheaval, the Christian Amhara settlers would utilize paramilitary units whose conduct would be described as "particularly brutal".

=== Martial law and military intervention (1966 - 1968) ===
Fighting gradually increased in intensity until 1966, at which point the Ethiopian government declared a state of emergency and deployed the army. That same year, the Bale rebels began coordinating with the Western Somali Liberation Front.

Fierce ground assaults and airstrikes by government forces in high and lowland Bale during the opening months of 1967 resulted in significant casualties amongst the civilian population. Many of the peasants and pastoralists who had homes and crops devastated in the air attacks were terror stricken as they had never seen bombs before. Thousands of Oromos fled to Somalia in the face of intensive aerial bombardments, where they remained for decades.

The town of Negele Borana served as the main base for the Ethiopian army during the revolt.

== Collapse and suppression ==
Between 1968 and 1969 the fortunes of the rebels began to decline.

=== Foreign support to Ethiopian government ===
The involvement of foreign military experts aided the government in crushing the insurgency, most notably from the United States and the United Kingdom. In 1968, the British government began aiding the Ethiopian government by facilitating the construction of a bridge across the strategic Ganale River, enabling Ethiopian forces to assail vital insurgent bases in the region. British military engineers further aided the creation of roads into rebel territory. The US government also began to assist Ethiopian forces by providing technical assistance and by training the Ethiopian Air Force in aerial based counter insurgent tactics.

=== 1969 Somali coup d'état ===
In 1969, after a military coup d'état in Somalia, support for the rebellion was withdrawn. Following the demise of the Somali Republic, the rebels found it virtually impossible to sustain their combat operations in Bale as the Somali arms shipments had been essential.

=== Negotiated settlement (1970) ===
Soon after, an agreement was reached with the Ethiopian government, and many predominant Oromo leaders were pardoned, marking a formal end to the conflict in 1970.

== Consequences and legacy ==
The Bale Revolt to this day remains as symbol of Oromo Nationalism and self-determination. While the exact origins of the Oromo Liberation Front are disputed, many point to the 1960s insurgency as its embryonic phase.

According to Dr. Yonatan Tesfaye Fessha, the Bale Revolt was a testimony to the disgruntlement that was prevalent among the southern local population. This was due to the policies of Haile Selassie's government. Ethiopian historian Gebru Tareke claimed that the revolt was, "...the longest peasant struggle in contemporary Ethiopian history, and its longevity was as much due to the resolve and competence of the insurgents [as to Islam] that served as the ideological matrix of organization and mobilization.”
