= Embabo =

Town in Orimia, Ethiopia

Coordinates: 9°44′04″N 37°33′58″E

- Town
- Interactive map of Embabo
- Country: Ethiopia
- Elevation: 2,231 m (7,320 ft)
- Time zone: UTC/GMT+3

Embabo (Embbo) is a town in Ethiopia's Region of Oromia (Africa), with the region font code Africa/Middle East. It is 2,231 metres above sea level. Ambabo, Embabo, Embbo, Gara Cai-cai-ba, Gare Kakarba, Imbabe, Imbabo, Imbabu, Imbab, mbabu are all alternate name of Embbo.

Embabo's standard time zone is UTC/GMT+3.

== History ==
The Battle of Embabo took place on 6 June 1882 between Negus Menelik's Shewan forces and Negus Tekle Haymanot's Gojjame forces. This is one of three battles (along with Chelenqo and Adwa) that Donald Donham attributes to the establishment of Shewan supremacy over the rest of Ethiopia.
