= Wolane people =

Ethnic group in Ethiopia

Wolane
Total population
- 160,000

Regions with significant populations
- Ethiopia: 160,000

Languages
- Wolane

Religion
- predominately Islam

The Wolane people are an ethnic group in central Ethiopia. Wolane people speak a Semitic language which is closely related to Sil'te, Zay and Harari languages.

== History ==
Tradition states some of the Wolane people's ancestors were Kabir Hamid who arrived from Harar as well as saint Aw Barkhadle. Wolane are considered as once an extension of the ancient Harari of Harla people alongside the Silt'e prior to the Oromo expansions of the sixteenth century.

In the thirteenth century, Wolane were historically associated with the Muslim state of Hadiya Sultanate and designated Hadiya people alongside other ethnic groups in the region. In the 1600s, their leader Garad of Hadiya Sidi Mohammed defeated the troops of Emperor Susenyos I at the Battle of Hadiya thus protecting their frontier from Abyssinian annexation for the next three hundred years.

The domain of the Wolane in the 19th century consisted of Zabbidar which served as one of several major marketplaces in the region. Wolane's territory was annexed into Gurage after Abyssinian forces of Menelik invaded in the 1800s following the defeat of Qebena leader Hassan Enjamo. Wolane domain today remains under the Gurage zone's easternmost district, however there has been calls by the Wolane to push for a separate Wolane region.

== Wolane Community ==
The Wolane community consists of 160,000 people. Some live in Addis Ababa. The Wolane in the countryside live mostly in higher places, called "Däga". These places are very suitable for the cultivation of Enset, which is one of Wolane people staple foods.

== Bibliography ==
- Crass, J. & Meyer, R. (2001). The Qabena and the Wolane: Two people of the Gurage Region and their Respective Histories according to their Own Oral Tradition.
