= Hadiya people =

Ethnic group native to Ethiopia

Hadiya
Hadiyya (Hadiyya)
- Traditional Hadiya design, used on both mens' and womens' clothing

Total population
- 1,269,382 (2007)

Regions with significant populations
- Hadiya Zone, Central Ethiopia Regional State

Languages
- Hadiya

Religion
- Majority: Christianity (P'ent'ay); Minority: Islam

Related ethnic groups
- Kebena • Oromo • Sidama • Kambata • Afar • Somali

Hadiya (Amharic: ሐድያ, romanized: Hadya), known natively as Hadiyya, is an ethnic group native to Ethiopia in southern region who speak the Hadiya language. Hadiya people were mainly Muslim or practiced indigenous beliefs (Fandaanano) in the 13th–16th centuries until the conquest of Menelik II in the 19th century that caused conversions to Orthodox Christianity and increasing Protestant (P'ent'ay) missionaries in late 1930s.

== Etymology ==
According to a popular etymology, the name Hadiya means "gift of God" in Arabic, as jihad warriors were reported to exclaim the phrase as they invaded Christian empire. It is mainly known for its Islamic influences in southern part of south Shewa and west Sharka. A historical definition of the Hadiya people based on the old Hadiya Sultanate included a number of Ethiopian ethnic groups currently known by other names. Currently, this historic entity is subdivided into a number of ethnonyms, partly with different languages and cultural affiliations. In his book A History of the Hadiyya in Southern Ethiopia, Ulrich Braukämper reported that Leemo, Weexo-giira (Baadogo, Haballo, Bargaago, Waayabo, Hayyibba, Hoojje and Hanqaallo), Sooro, Shaashoogo, Baadawwaachcho, and Libido (Maraqo) Hadiya, the Hadiya proper. The term Hadiya specifically designates the Qabeena people. Other ethnic groups such as Siltʼe, Wulbareg, Azarnat, Barbare, Wuriro, Wolane and Gadabano profess that they're the seven Hadiya clans. Clans of Hadiya origin in Oromia, Sidama, Wolayta, Gurage, Tigray (Rayyaa, Azaaboo, and Ashaange), and Afar were completely absorbed by these nations. They were initially all inhabitants of a single political entity, a sultanate, which in the four centuries following its break-up in the mid-16th century fragmented into separate ethnic groups.

== History ==
The Hadiya people are the scattered remnants of a formerly much larger ethnic complex under the once mighty Muslim principality called Hadiya Sultanate. A connection with the Harla people who lived under the Harla Kingdom in the ninth century has been sometimes assumed but is unsubstantiated. A cluster of speakers labelled Hadiya-Sidama developed maintaining Islamic identity and later creating the Hadiya Sultanate as founding population. According to Hadiya elders, the dynasty was started by descendants of Harar Emir Abadir, who intermarried with Sidama. The earliest surviving mention of Hadiya is in the Kebra Nagast (ch. 94), indicating that the kingdom was in existence by the 13th century. Another early mention is in a manuscript written on the island monastery of Lake Hayq, which states that after conquering Damot, Emperor Amda Seyon I proceeded to Hadiya and brought it under his control using Gura armies from modern day Eritrea which would later become Gurage. Later during Amda Seyon's reign, the King of Hadiya, Amano, refused to submit to the Emperor of Ethiopia. Amano was encouraged in this by a Muslim "prophet of darkness" named Bel'am. Amda Seyon subsequently set forth for Hadiya, where he "slew the inhabitants of the country with the point of the sword", killing many of the inhabitants while enslaving others. Arab historian, Shihab al-Din al-'Umari (1300 – 1349), referred to Hadiya as a rich, the largest militarily and the most powerful Muslim state among the seven states of the Muslim federation of Zeila. Absence of strong successors to Amdä Sion provided the Border States almost a century in which to re-organize their power. Hadiya once again emerged as a cohesive unit. Its army was estimated at 40,000 horsemen and double the number of foot soldiers.

During the reign of Zara Yaqob (1434–1468), Garad Mahiko, the son of Garaad Mehmad, or Sultan of Hadiya, repeated his predecessor's actions and refused to submit to the Abyssinian Emperor. Mahiko collaborated with both the Hadiya people and Adalites to launch a conflict with Ethiopia. However, with the help of one of Mahiko's followers, the Garaad was deposed in favor of his uncle Bamo. Garaad Mahiko then sought sanctuary at the court of the Adal Sultanate. He was later slain by the military contingent Adal Mabrak, who had been in pursuit. The chronicles record that the Adal Mabrak sent Mahiko's head and limbs to Zara Yaqob as proof of his death. Following the annexation of Hadiya state by the Ethiopian Empire, Zara Yacob began a tradition of Abyssinian elites marrying high ranking Hadiya women, Zara Yaqob himself married Eleni which was denounced by Muslims in the region. In 1444 Eleni of Hadiya is mentioned in the Zara Yaqob chronicles as Empress, and she is linked to the aggression towards Ethiopia by Sultan Badlay of Adal.

According to Portuguese explorer Francisco Alvarez, Abyssinian Christian aristocracy continued marrying Hadiya Muslim women as late as the sixteenth century during the reign of Lebna Dengel. In the middle of the sixteenth century Hadiya chiefs informed the Adal leader Ahmed ibn Ibrahim al-Ghazi that their people were forced to give their Muslim daughters to the Emperor of Ethiopia to be converted to Christianity annually as tribute. Hadiya would join the Adal troops in its invasion of Ethiopia during the sixteenth century.

With the outbreak of Imam Ahmad's jihad in 1529, the rulers of Hadiya and Bale identified with the cause of Islam and Adal, slaughtered the Christian garrisons in their midst, and sent their best troops to help in the invasion of the Christian kingdom. The southern frontiers were left unguarded, and the Oromo began to break in. Meanwhile, the Christian reconquest under Galawdewos devastated northern Hadiya, but failed to check the Oromo advance. Crushed between the upper and the nether millstone, Hadiya as a state ceased to exist. Of its very diverse population, some, including most of the Rift valley pastoralists, joined the Oromo, adopting both their language and their gada social organization, which was the basis of their military strength. The rest fled in all directions, but eventually resettled themselves in pockets along the western margin of the Rift valley and in the adjoining highlands.

In the 1600s Garad Sidi Mohammed ruler of Hadiya defeated the troops of Emperor Susenyos I at the Battle of Hadiya.

In the late sixteenth century, the Hadiya regions were overrun by Oromo migrations. In 1689, Iyasu's Armenian trade agent, Khodja Murad told the Dutch in Batavia that the king of Hadiya had ‘‘submitted of his own free will to the rule of Abyssinia.’’ after suffering defeats and displacements by Oromos. The chief of Hadiya ‘‘together with his entire people’’ had ‘‘embraced the Christian religion’’, and married ‘‘a certain princess from the dynasty of the Abyssinian emperors.’’ However historians indicate the Hadiya Muslim cluster state survived until the Abyssinian invasion under Menelik II in the 1800s.

The Hadiya state of Qabeena under imam Umar Baksa capitulated to the Abyssinians without resistance due to fears of a direct occupation in 1875. This was opposed by nobles especially the Garad of Qabeena at the time Hassan Enjamo who began a resistance movement. In the following years, Hassan would expand his dominion into all of Hadiya, some parts of Gurage and Oromo territory. Hassan was however defeated in 1889 at the battle of Jabdu Meda leading to Qabeena Hadiya states annexation by the Abyssinians. The last remaining Halaba Hadiya state held off until 1893 under their chief Barre Kagaw when the Abyssinians took advantage of the famine that had struck the region and led a conquest into their territory.

== Identity ==
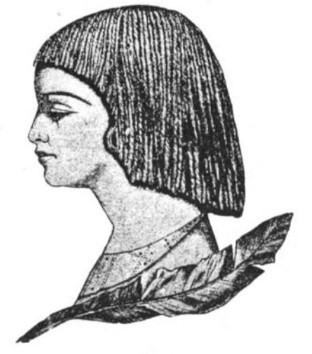
Portrayal of a Hadiya girl named Mardia by Jules Borelli in the late 19th century

Historical definition of Hadiya people includes a number of Ethiopian ethnic groups currently known by other names according to ethnologist Ulrich Braukämper, who lived in various parts of southern-central Ethiopia for over four years during his research. In his book titled A history of the Hadiya in Southern Ethiopia, he established linkages to the ancient Hadiya Kingdom. Currently, Hadiya is not a homogeneous ethnic group but is rather sub-divided into a number of ethnonyms, partly with different languages and cultural affiliations. They were initially all inhabitants of a single political entity, a Sultanate, which in the 4th centuries following its break-down became remarkably diverse. The Libidoo (Maräqo), Leemo, Sooro, Shaashoogo, and Baadawwaachcho remained a language entity and preserved an identity of oneness, the Hadiya proper. The term Hadiya specifically designates the Qabeena people. Other ethnic groups such as Siltʼe, Wulbareg, Azarnat, Barbare, Wuriro, Wolane and Gadabano profess that they're the seven Hadiya clans. Ancient Hadiyans are distinguished by their Muslim heritage however these populations have decreased in the following centuries. Hadiya are related to the Harari. During the military campaigns of Emir Nur ibn Mujahid, a troop contingent of Somalis reached the slopes of the Gurage Mountains whose descendants have preserved the name "Barbare" which is said to have derived from the port-town of Berbera. This origin was affirmed by the Barbare in the Gurage zone.

== Hadiya sub-groups ==
1. Current Hadiyyisa speaking groups (Hadiya proper): Leemo, Sooro, Shaashoogo, Baadawwaachcho, Haballo, Hojje, Sha’ammanna, Gabara, Baadoogo (Weexo Giira-Baadoog, Haballo)

2. Libidoo (Maraqo, Marako) (total about 27 sub-groups): Abaachche, Agabeello, Waaremanna, Weerarmanna, etc.

3. Cushitic speaking: Alaaba and Qabeena

4. East-Gurage speaking: Azernet, Barbare, Ulbarag, Woriro, Wolane, Zay, Gadabaano, Abeechcho, Aboosare, Abbiyyo, Gammaso, Wosharmine, Qaalisha, Shandar

5. Hadiya Clans in Arsi and Bale: Abaanna, Abbayymanna, Abbure, Aboosara, Holbaatmanna, Wonamanna, Woshermine, Yabsanna, Oodomanna, Lataamanna, Insemanna, Dollomana, etc.

6. Hadiya Clans in Sidama: Buchche (Bushe) (5 Clans): Fakisa, Hollo, Malga, and Awacho

7. Hadiya Clans in Wolega (among Maaca Oromo around Nekemte)

8. Hadiya Clans in Wolayta (total 11 sub-groups): Ansoomooso, Bohalmanna, Doodichchmanna, Haballooso

9. Hadiya Clans in Harar (among Ittu Oromo, total 5 sub-groups): Abosaara, Asalmanna (Asallicho(Haballosa)), Dooyyomanna, Horsumanna, Tokkomanna

10. Alaaba (total 12 sub-groups): Bukaanna, Kitaabo, Kolmine, Shaamanna

11. Hadiya clans in Kambata (Haballo clans dominantly and Bargage)

12. Hadiya clans in Afar and Somali

13. Hadiya clans in Amhara and Tigray (Raya)

14. Hadiya clans around Jimma and Kafa (Haballosa and Badoge)

In addition, the Habarnoosa (Haballosa) clan claim descent from the Habar Yoonis subclan of Isaaq.

== Social and political life ==
The Hadiya Zone is named after the Hadiya people, whose homeland covers part of this administrative division. The 2007 Ethiopian national census reported that 1,269,382 people (or 1.5% of the population) identified themselves as Hadiya, of whom 150,087 were urban inhabitants. The Southern Nations, Nationalities, and People's Region is home to 93.9% of this people.

== Natural environment ==
The area occupied by the Hadiya proper and groups of Hadiya descent extends from the upper Gibe in the west to the bend of the Wabi Šäbälle in the east. Transferred to the administrative map of Ethiopia of the 1970s, the area comprises southern Šäwa, the entire General Arsi and the north of Bale. On today's map it covers the Hadiya Zone and parts of the Gurage Zone in the north of the Southern Nations, Nationalities and Peoples’ Regional State (SNNPRS) and some central-southern parts of Oromia. The geography of this region is characterized by a division into an eastern and a western zone by the Ethiopian Rift Valley, which is a part of the great East African Rift System. The main areas inhabited by the Hadiya, who have preserved their original ethnic identity, are situated on the western edge of the Rift Valley; east of the axis there are only parts assimilated by ethnic groups who are known by other names. The Rift Valley extends in a north-north-easterly direction from approximately 6° north latitude as a rough estimate, and continues through the Awaš depression towards the funnel-shaped Afar lowlands. Within this massive rupture zone, which came into being in the middle tertiary period, there is a difference in altitude of between 1,250m (Lake Abbayya) to sometimes well over 2,000m.

== Notable Hadiya people ==
- Eleni of Ethiopia, empress of Ethiopia
- Aze, 16th century leader of Hadiya
- Side Mohammed, 17th century leader of Hadiya
- Hassan Enjamo, 19th century leader of Hadiya
- Beyene Petros – Was a professor of biology at Addis Ababa University, former member of the Ethiopian House of People's Representatives, former chairman of Forum for Democratic Dialogue in Ethiopia or Medrek (FDDE), and former head of Public Relations & External Affairs, and chairman of Ethiopian Social Democratic Party (ESDP).
- Habtamu Wondimu – Professor of Social Psychology in the College of Education of Addis Ababa University, Ethiopia.
- Fantu Magiso Manedo - an Ethiopian runner specializing in the 400 metres and 800 metres.
- Garad Amano-Famous King of Hadiya in 14th century
- Garad Mehamed-Chief of Hadiya and father of Princess Eleni
- Garad Mahiko-Famous King of Hadiya in 15th century

== See also ==
- Hadiya Sultanate
- Hadiya Zone
- Hadiya language
- Cushitic peoples
- Kingdom of Kush
- Leemo people
