= Yusuf bin Ahmad al-Kawneyn =

10th-century Muslim scholar

Yusuf bin Ahmad al-Kawneyn يوسف بن أحمد الكونين
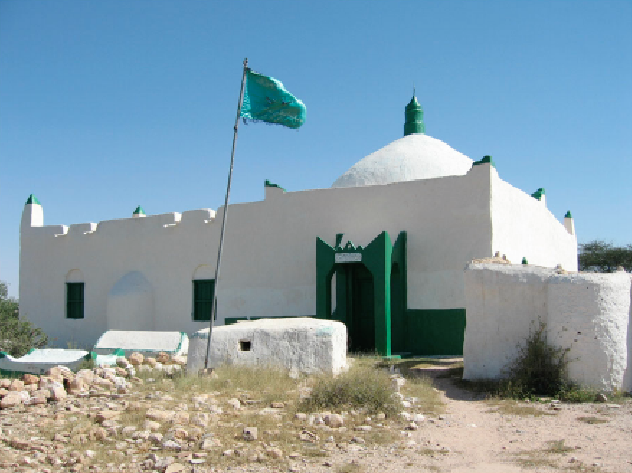
- Shrine of Al-Kawneyn in Aw-Barkhadle, Somaliland
- Title: Sheikh

Personal life
- Born: Zeila in the 10th century
- Era: 10th century
- Main interest(s): Islamic literature, Islamic philosophy

Religious life
- Religion: Islam
- Jurisprudence: Shafi'i

Yusuf bin Ahmad al-Kawneyn (Arabic: يوسف بن أحمد الكونين) (b. 10th century), popularly known as Aw Barkhadle ("Blessed Father") or Yusuf Al Kownayn, was an Islamic scholar and traveler based in Zeila, Somalia. According to Dr. Enrico Cerulli, Yusuf Al Kawneyn is referenced in the Harar manuscripts.

== Biography ==
Local Somali oral tradition and written Ethiopian history present Aw Barkhadle as having arrived to the northern Somali region from Arabia as a Sharif to spread Islam. Anthropologist I. M. Lewis and the African Studies Centre Leiden corroborate this tradition, characterizing him as an Arab proselytizer. Archaeologist Sada Mire similarly recorded local historical legends of “an Arabian sheikh" that came to the settlement formerly known as Dogor, subsequently named Aw-Barkhadle after him. Archaeologist Jorge de Torres Rodríguez presents Aw Barkhadle as a missionary that confronted pagan religious figures. Although Rodríguez classifies him as a "Somali saint".

However, some scholars hold the opinion that suggests Arabian origin stories pertaining to ancestral saints such as Yusuf, are potentially a myth by scholars and an Islamification of a pre-Islamic origin story that relates back to Waaq and ancestor worship. These myths would tie the Somalis to the prophets clan (Quraysh). Religious synchronism where the old religion is adapted to reflect the hegemony of the new in that the ancestral home of the ancestors in Arabia, the headquarters of Islam. Thus Yusuf has been affirmed to have 'exalted origins' through being related to the prophet.

Yusuf is described by some scholars as a native of Somalia and as a Somali who studied in his city Zeila and later in Iraq. As a result of his studies in Iraq, he was given the title of "Al Baghdadi" as well. He is also noted for having devised a Somali nomenclature for the Arabic vowels, this would eventually evolve into Wadaad's writing. The notation system he developed had been described as "too authentically Somali" for an Arab to have completed independently.

He is accredited in certain areas for the introduction of black-headed fat-tailed sheep also known as Berbera Blackhead.

Described by some as a Sharif, he has been described as "the most outstanding saint in Somaliland". Yusuf's son Muhia ad-Din Yusuf Aw-Barkhadle is listed as Emir of Harar in 1038AD.

The sheikh is also known for spreading the Islamic faith to Southeast Asia, after traveling there from Zeila. He is also known as being a member of the Somali 'Diwan al-awliya' (Famous Saints of Somali Origin).

== Family and Ancestral legacy ==
Sheikh Yusuf Al Kawneyn is also associated with the Walashma dynasty of Ifat and Adal, which was a medieval Muslim dynasty in the Horn of Africa. It governed the Ifat and Adal Sultanates in what are parts of present-day Somaliland, Djibouti and eastern Ethiopia. Sheikh Yusuf is described by some historians as being the ancestor of this royal family. He is also known as representing the spiritual legacy of the Ifat and Adal Sultanates. Some historians trace Sheikh Yusuf Al Kawneyn to the Gadabursi clan, which primarily inhabits the Horn of Africa. According to Somalis of Issa, the Wardiq one of their sub clans are also descendants of this saint. This Issa tradition revolves around the induction of Harla clans into Somali lineage such as Horoone. A few ethnic groups in modern southern Ethiopia claim descent from Aw Barkhadle which include Silt'e and Wolane people. A descendant of Barkhadle was one of the key negotiators during the surrender of Emirate of Harar in 1887 to the Abyssinians.

== Shrines ==
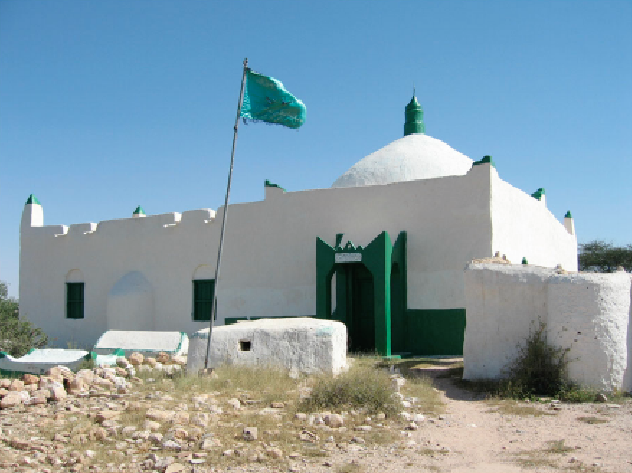
Main shrine of Saint Aw Barkhadle, 2007

The sheikh has shrines dedicated to him in Sri Lanka, in the town of Aw-Barkhadle, northeast of Hargeisa in Somaliland, in a site called Qoranyale, near the town of Borama. Shrines are also to be found in eastern modern Ethiopia near Fedis as well as in Harar.

According to C.J Cruttenden, the tomb of saint Aw Barkhadle, which is located to the southwest of Berbera, was used by the Isaaq clans to settle disputes and to swear oaths of alliances under a holy relic attributed to Bilal Ibn Rabah. The Eidagale historically acted as mediators.

When any grave question arises affecting the interests of the Isaakh tribe in general. On a paper yet carefully preserved in the tomb, and bearing the sign-manual of Belat [Bilal], the slave of one of the early khaleefehs, fresh oaths of lasting friendship and lasting alliances are made...In the season of 1846 this relic was brought to Berbera in charge of the Haber Gerhajis, and on it the rival tribes of Aial Ahmed and Aial Yunus swore to bury all animosity and live as brethren.

According to renowned Somali anthropologist I.M. Lewis in his book Saints and Somalis: Popular Islam in a Clan-based Society, the descendants of Sheikh Isaaq (the Isaaq clan) annually gather at the historic shrine of Saint Aw Barkhadle to pay respects in the form of siyaaro (localized pilgrimage with offerings). As Aw Bardhadle had no known descendants, the descendants of the Saint's friend and contemporary figure, Sheikh Isaaq, will remember Aw Barkhadle in his stead:

Since, however, Aw Barkhadle’s precise connection with the rulers of Ifat is not widely known, he appears as an isolated figure, and in comparison with the million or so spears of the Isaaq lineage, a saint deprived of known issue. The striking difference between these two saints is explained in a popular legend, according to which, when Sheikh Isaaq and Aw Barkhadle met, the latter prophesied that Isaaq would be blessed by God with many children. He, however, would not have descendants, but Isaaq’s issue would pay him respect and siyaaro (voluntary offerings). So it is, one is told, that every year the Isaaq clansmen gather at Aw Barkhadle’s shrine to make offerings in his name.

Aw Barkhadle's shrine near Fadis was set alight during the Ogaden War by the Ethiopian militia in 1977.

== Aw Barkhadle ==
Tradition states Barkhadle travelled extensively from Mogadishu to Berbera, Hargeisa and finally Harar where he allegedly stayed for 300 years of his 500 year life. Towards the end of his reign he built a mosque in Dogar. Before Al-Kowneyn's arrival into this town (now named after him) was called Dogor. The residents were not Muslim, but rather pagan, believing and taking part of a pre-Islamic Somaliland religion called Wagar. The Wagar itself is thought to be an anthropomorphic representation of a sacred feature or figure, indicating an indigenous non-Islamic religious fertility practice in Aw Barkhaadle. The word "wagar"/"Waĝa" (or "Waaq") denotes the Sky-God adhered to by many Cushitic people (including the Konso) in the Horn of Africa including the Somali in pre-Islamic times both before and during the practice of Christianity and Islam.

While completing his studies in Zayla, Al Kowneyn was told of a town in present-day Somalia called Dogor, with an oppressive king called Bu‘ur Ba‘ayr who is believed to be a Yibir. According to the legend, Bu‘ur Ba‘ayr married couples by sleeping with the bride during the first six nights of the marriage and engaged in acts of paganism and magic. Local people at Aw-Barkhadle attribute the conversion of locals to Islam, to the defeat by duel of the previous religious leader, Bu‘ur Ba‘ayr, by the Muslim newcomer Aw-Barkhadle, who heard of the oppressive nature of the king and wanted to stop him. The Saint showed the religious superiority of his beliefs in contrast to the local beliefs of Bu‘ur Ba‘ayr's followers, whom the former won over in great number.

Furthermore, the Aw-Barkhadle site is an important burial site of the Muslim rulers of the Adal Sultanate. Al-Kowneyn himself of the Walashma dynasty of the thirteenth and fourteenth centuries AD is buried in this town.

== Sri Lankan Muslim settlement ==
Yusuf bin Ahmad al-Kawneyn is also credited with starting the first Sri Lankan Muslim settlement. It is located in western Sri Lanka and is named Berbereen (Beruwala) in honour and respect of the Shaykh.

== Places ==
A village is named after Yusuf bin Ahmad al-Kawneyn in the Harari Region named Aw Barkhadle.

== See also ==
- Islam in Somaliland
- Sheikh Isaaq Bin Ahmed Bin Mohammed – 12th century Islamic leader in the northwestern Somaliland area, and founder of the Isaaq clan
- Abdirahman bin Isma'il al-Jabarti
