= Sultanate of Arababni =

Medieval Gurage based Muslim sultanate in the Horn of Africa

The Sultanate of Arababni (also known as Arbabni or Arabini) was a small Muslim sultanate located in what is now the Arsi Zone of Ethiopia. Founded around the 12th century, it was the smallest and weakest of the Muslim kingdoms described by the Muslim geographers al-Umari and al-Makrizi. Its inhabitants followed the Hanafi school and the state was considered part of the Zeila region.

== History ==
The Sultanate of Arababni was conquered by the Ethiopian Empire and made part of Fatagar. Fatagar, and thus, Arbabni is the region southeast of the modern capital Addis Ababa, essentially corresponding to the modern West Shewa Zone and Arsi Zone. The Oromo migrations led to the region being renamed for the third time to Arsi, after the Arsi Oromo. The Fatagar region, being one of the former independent Muslim states in the region, was a primary target of the jihad of Ahmad ibn Ibrahim al-Ghazi, Imam of the Adal Sultanate. During the reign of Emperor Amde Tsiyon I, Arbabni was conquered and annexed by Ethiopia and became part of the Fatagar province. Fatagar was occupied by the Oromo people during the Oromo migrations.
