= Waqo Gutu =

Ethiopian rebel and Oromo nationalist

General Waqo Gutu
- Waaqo Guutuu Usuu
- Born: 1924; Odaa, Ethiopian Empire
- Died: 3 February 2006 (aged 81–82); Nairobi, Kenya
- Burial place: Bale Zone, Ethiopia
- Military career
- Allegiance: Bale Rebel Movement; United Oromo People Liberation Front
- Service years: 1960–1969
- Conflicts: Bale Revolt; Ethiopian Civil War

Waqo Gutu Usu (1924 – 3 February 2006) was an Oromo revolutionary and leader of one of the earlier Oromo resistance fighter movements; the Bale Revolt, which in the 1960s had fought against the feudalistic system in place in the Ethiopian Empire. He was elected chairman of the United Liberation Forces of Oromia in 2000. In 2006, Gutu died in a Nairobi hospital, survived by 20 sons and 17 daughters.

== Life ==
He was born to an Oromo father and a Somali mother. Little is known about his early schooling or ideological basis for his rebellion against Emperor Haile Selassie and the regimes that followed the monarch’s ouster and murder. Assessments of Waqo Gutu vary greatly over his role as "founder" of Oromo separatism. However, according to historians (erroneously), Waqo Gutu was ideologically and militarily trained by Somalis to initiate the Oromo separatism movement called the Somali Abo Liberation Front (SALF).

His role in starting the Bale Revolt was almost accidental, according to one source. When a conflict over grazing rights between two groups of Oromo was ignored by the central government, after waiting in vain for three months Waqo Gutu "went to Somalia and brought back 42 rifles and two Thompson submachine guns." Waqo's journey took place early in 1965; the revolt itself had been raging since June 1963 when Kahin Abdi openly defied the government in Afder. An ill-timed attempt by the government to collect unpaid taxes from local peasants fanned the flames. At the end of 1966, about three-fifths of Bale Province was in turmoil. This revolt ran from 1964 to 1970, stemming from issues involving land, taxation, class, and religion. Waqo Gutu surrendered to the Ethiopian government 27 March 1970. The cost of the rebellion was minimal to him; he was given a villa in Addis Ababa and treated well by the Emperor. The local Oromo peasants lost tens of thousands of hectares, which was redistributed to Orthodox Christian settlers who moved down from the north and had fought against the rebels.

With the eruption of the Ethiopian revolution, Waqo Gutu visited several countries, including Somalia to raise funds with which to arm and galvanize the struggle.

In 1989 he established the United Oromo People Liberation Front (UOPLF) to join the struggle against the dictator Mengistu Haile Mariam. He joined the victorious Tigrayan People's Liberation Front (TPLF) which had ousted Mengistu, but Waqo left the transitional government talks in 1992, claiming he had been betrayed by the TPLF.

In 2000 he formed the ULFO to unite the disparate armed and political groups fighting for the right to self-determination of the Oromo, and led as chairman from 2002 until he was taken ill and flown to Nairobi where he died after three months' hospitalisation. He was buried 11 February in his birthplace in the Bale Zone.

== Legacy ==
Following the fall of the EPRDF regime in 2018, a statue of Waqo Gutu was erected in Bale.
