= Bale Province, Ethiopia =

Former province in southeastern Ethiopia

Coordinates: 6°N 42°E

Location of Bale within the Ethiopian Empire

Bale (Oromo: Baalee; Amharic: ባሌ), also known as Bali, is the name of a former province of eastern Ethiopia with its capital city at Bale Robe.

== History ==
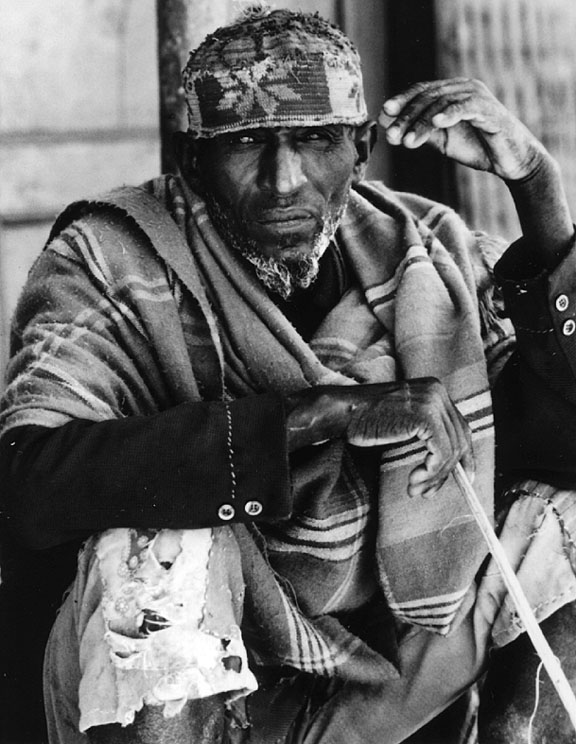
A peasant from Bale, Ethiopia

Bale was considered the domain of the Emirate of Harar until Menelik's conquest of the kingdom in 1887 and consequently became incorporated into modern Ethiopia from thereon. In reality, Bale was occupied by the Arsi Oromo and Somalis in the east of the province.

The modern province was created in 1960 out of the province of Harerge south of the Shebelle by the Haile Selassie regime. The lowlands of both Bale and Harerge encompassed Ethiopia's portion of the Ogaden region. According to Ulrich Braukämper, this new province created in the 20th century is not be conflated with the historical province of Bale which was minuscule and only comprised the north eastern part of the modern region.

Beginning in 1963, Waqo Gutu led a rebellion which at one point involved all of Bale. The Ethiopian military was not able to put it down until 1969. Waqo Gutu did not offer his surrender until February of the following year, and afterward was granted a commission in the Ethiopian Army.

With the adoption of the constitution in 1995, Bale was divided between the Oromia and Somali Regions of Ethiopia.

== Topography ==
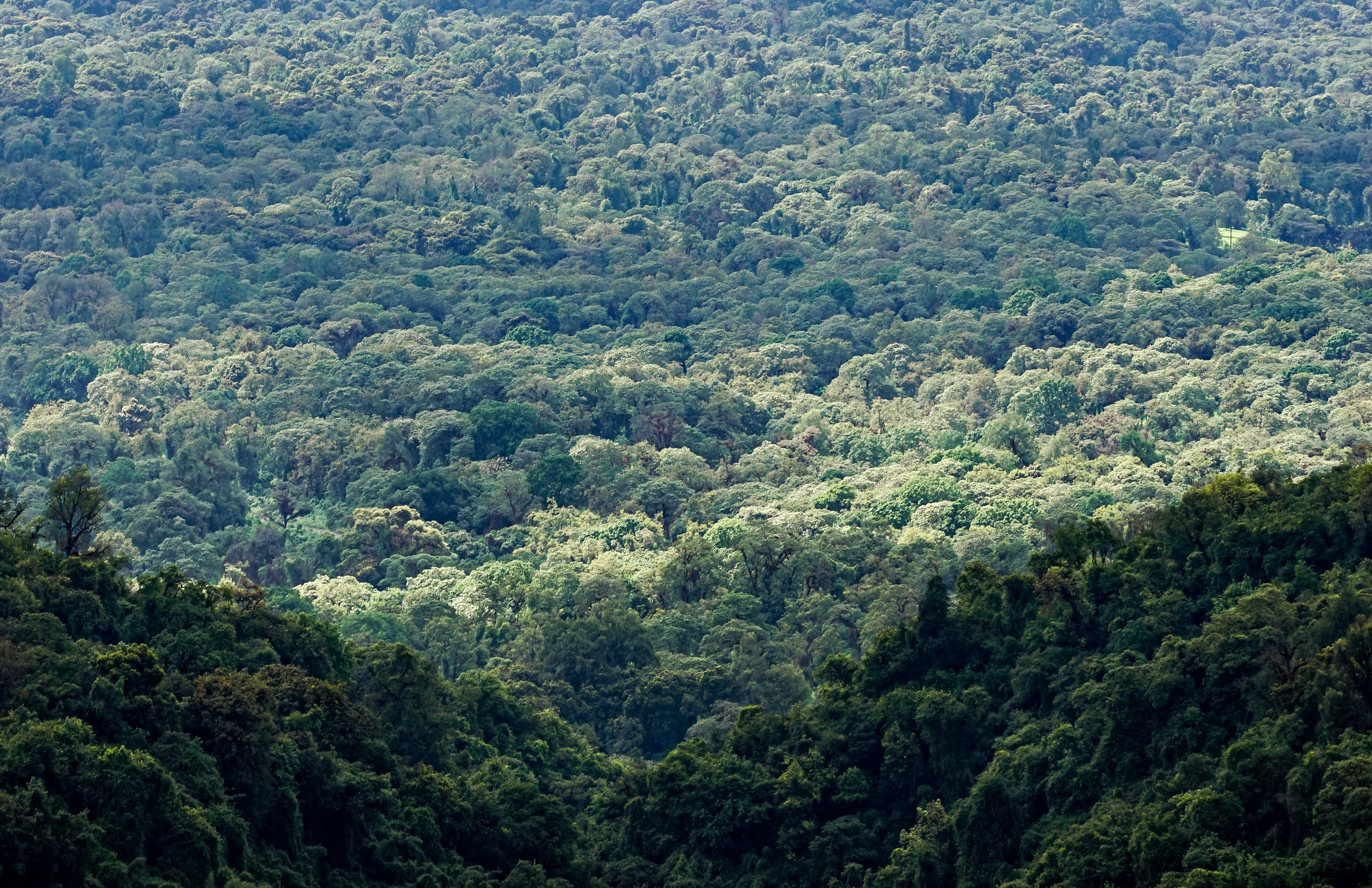
Dense forest cover in Bale Mountain National Park

Arid plains, highland plateaus, woodlands, and mountain ranges are all part of Bale's diversified topography. There are many climates and ecosystems, which produce a wide range of flora and fauna, including numerous endemic species. The Wabe Shebelle River, which marks Bale's northern boundary, has carved out numerous deep canyons that serve as physical barriers to the surrounding regions. Bale is divided from the southern Gujii and Boorana regions by the Genale River, which forms part of the southern boundary. Other important rivers in the area include the Weib, Welmel, and Dumal.

== See also ==
- Bale Zone
- Bale (historical region)
- Oromo people
- Somali people
- Harar
