= Habte =

Habte is a given name. Notable people with the name include:

- Habte Giyorgis (1851–1927), Ethiopian Minister of War
- Habte Jifar (born 1976), Ethiopian middle-distance runner
- Habte Negash (born 1967), Ethiopian long-distance runner
- Mahisente Habte Mariam, widow of Prince Sahle Selassie
- Aklilu Habte-Wold (1912–1974), Ethiopian former Prime Minister
- Elizabeth Habte Wold (born 1963), Ethiopian mixed-media artist
