= Habtamu Wondimu =

Ethiopian academic

Habtamu Wondimu is professor of social psychology in the College of Education of Addis Ababa University, Ethiopia. In 2007-2008 he was part of the Fulbright New Century Scholars Program.
