= Siltʼe people =

Ethnic group in Ethiopia

Siltʼe
Total population
- 940,766 (2007)

Regions with significant populations
- Ethiopia

Languages
- Siltʼe

Religion
- Islam

Related ethnic groups
- Harari; Zay; Amhara; Tigray; Tigre; Gurage; other Ethiosemitic peoples

The Siltʼe people are an ethnic group in southern Ethiopia. They inhabit the Siltʼe Zone which is part of the Central Ethiopia Regional State. Silt'e people speak the Siltʼe language, a Semitic language, which is closely related to the Harari language.

== History ==
Siltʼe denote their origin in Harar and claim to be progenitors of the Hadiya Sultanate. The country of the Silt'e first appears in fourteenth-century texts as Silt'e-Ge. Tradition states that some of Silt'e's forefathers were Harar residents Kabir Hamid and saint Aw Barkhadle.

Other clans within Silt'e also claim descent from Hajji Aliye who accompanied Ahmed ibn Ibrahim al-Ghazi's troops during the Ethiopian-Adal war in the sixteenth century. The Silt'e are considered as once an extension of the ancient Harari of Harla people alongside Wolane prior to the Oromo expansions of the sixteenth century. In the 1600s their leader Garad of Seba Hadiya Sidi Mohammed defeated the troops of Emperor Susenyos I at the Battle of Hadiya thus protecting their frontier from Abyssinian annexation for the next three hundred years.

The last Garad of the Gan-Silte dynasty was Sediso K’albo before Menelik's forces invaded in the 1800s. Silte people were incorporated into Gurage region after their lands were annexed by Ethiopia following the defeat of the Hadiya leader Hassan Enjamo. The Abyssinian commander Gobana Dacche in the late 19th century is stated to have ravaged the lands of Silt'e during his invasion and divided Silt'e lands among the Neftenya.

In the early 90s Silte obtained a separate zone following protests that the Gurage ethnic label was imposed on them.

== Notable people ==
- Sidi Mohammed, seventeenth century leader of Hadiya state
- Rophnan Muzeyin Nuri https://www.tiktok.com/t/ZP8UoUHYk/
- Muferiat Kamil
- Redwan Hussein
- Siraj Fegessa
- Muktar Edris
- Tsedenia Gebremarkos

== Bibliography ==
- Abdulfetah Huldar 2000 (A.D.): Islam be-Ityopya inna ye-Silte hizb tarikinna bahil. Addis Ababa (in Amharic).
- Abdulfetah Huldar 2002 (A.D.): YeSiltʼennat beherawi magalachʼawochchinna la-Ityopyawinet hilwinanna idiget yabarekketut asitewas'o. Addis Ababa (in Amharic).
- Abraham Hussen and Habtamu Wandimmo 1983 (E.C.): Ba-Siltʼiñña qwanqwa tanagari hizb ye-Azernet Berbere hibratasab bahilinna tarik. Addis Ababa (in Amharic).
- Ulrich Braukämper 1980: Die Geschichte der Hadiyya Süd-Äthiopiens. Wiesbaden. Franz-Steiner Verlag.
- Dirk Bustorf 2005: "Ennäqor ethnography". In: Siegbert Uhlig (ed.): Encyclopaedia Aethiopica. vol. 2: D-Ha. Wiesbaden. p. 309-10
- Dirk Bustorf 2006: "Ase Zäʼra Yaʼǝqobs Kinder. Spuren der Vorbevölkerung von Selte-Land". Aethiopica 9. pp. 23–48.
- Dirk Bustorf 2010: "Sǝlṭi ethnography". In: Siegbert Uhlig (ed.): Encyclopaedia Aethiopica. vol. 4: O-X. Wiesbaden: Harrassowitz. pp. 607–608.
- Dirk Bustorf 2010: "Wǝlbaräg". In: Siegbert Uhlig (ed.): Encyclopaedia Aethiopica. vol. 4: O-X. Wiesbaden: Harrassowitz. pp. 1178–1179.
- Dirk Bustorf 2011: Lebendige Überlieferung: Geschichte und Erinnerung der muslimischen Siltʼe Äthiopiens. With an English Summary. Wiesbaden: Harrassowitz (Aethiopistische Forschungen 74).
- Nishi Makoto 2005: Making and Unmaking of the National-State and Ethnicity in Modern Ethiopia: a Study on the History of the Silte People. African Study Monographs. Supplementary Issue 29. pp. 157–68 online version
- Dinberu Alamu et al. 1987 (E.C.): Gogot. Yegurage biherasab tarik, bahilinna qwanqwa, Walqite (in Amharic).
- Rahmeto Hussein 1984: "The History of Azernet-Berbere until the Expansion of Shoa During Menelik II", Senior Essay, Department of History, Addis Ababa University .
