= Sidi Mohammed =

Ruler of Hadiya

- Garad

Governor of Hadiya
- Reign: early 1600s
- Born: Hadiya Sultanate
- Religion: Islam
- Occupation: state leader

Sidi Mohammed was the Garad (chief) of the Hadiya Sultanate in the beginning of the seventeenth century. He is considered a descendant of some of the Silt'e clan originators as well as Halaba and Qabena ethnic group.

== Militant career ==
Garad Sidi is known for defeating the soldiers of Abyssinian emperor Susenyos I at the Battle of Hadiya in the 1600s. Initially, Sidi sought to evade confrontation with the emperor; however, he became involved once the emperor pursued him. The Abyssinian army was composed of Gurage-Oromo units positioned on the flanks, while the Amhara occupied the center. The Gurage were the first to break formation and retreat, followed closely by the Oromo. It is reported that Sidi's Hadiyan army completely decimated the Abyssinian forces. The surviving Abyssinians were captured and sold as slaves to the neighboring Emirate of Harar.

== See also ==
- Aze, sixteenth century leader of Hadiya
