= Wej province =

10th-century kingdom in modern Ethiopia

Wej (Amharic: ወጅ) was a province established in the 10th-century and located in the southwest of what is now Ethiopia.

== Location ==
According to G. W. B Huntingford, Wej occupied an area near Lake Zway, west of Fatagar and east of Hadiya.

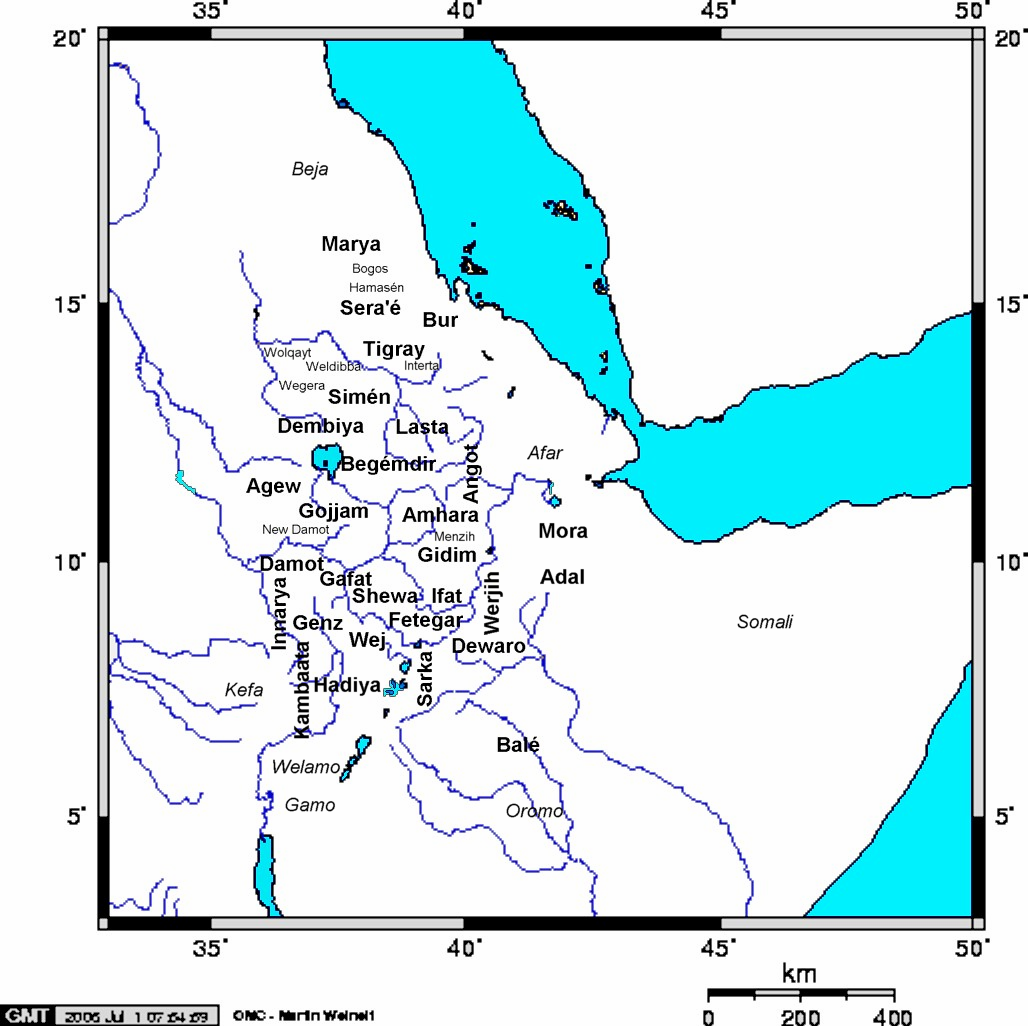
Map of medieval Ethiopian provinces, with Wej south west of Shewa, east of Genz, west of Fetegar, and north of Hadiya, and north east of Sharkha.

== Origins ==
There have been arguments over the ruling family's ethnicity. The extinct ethnic group Maya are held by some sources to have been the original rulers, but others state that Wej campaigned against the Maya, while early Arab writers recorded that Oromos were living in the area and founded several kingdoms, Wej among them. According to Mohammed Hassen the inhabitants of Wej were probably the Waji Oromo a sub clan of the Arusi Barentu tribe.

== History ==
Enrico Cerulli asserted the people of Wej had leaders whose lineage identified with eleventh century Muslim Queen Badit of the Makhzumi dynasty. Pankhurst states that Wej was an ally of Ethiopian king Yekuno Amlak and supported him in his conquest of Abyssinia. It is described as a tributary state ruled by Govorner Zebadar. A Malassay by the name of Asmaddin from Wej had assisted Emperor Sarsa Dengel at the Battle of Endagabatan.

Christian missionaries were sent annually to Wej during the era of Abuna Yaqob. He also sent Abba Iyosyas to supervise the kingdom, as well as neighbouring Almale and Gurage.

== Zway (Zay) Era 1400s-1498 ==
After the Fall of Ifat, many ethnicities and kingdoms fell weak, among them the Oromo Muslims, so the Zay people expanded from their homeland Enderta.

When the Oromo first met the Zway people's they did not know what they were doing due to their smart modern fishing and sailing techniques. The Oromo gave them the name Laqi which means Paddler. The Oromo, and the Zway became friends and later protected each other.

The Oromo and Zway lived in the area until the Maya expansion, where many Oromo and Zway were displaced. Brakumper states the Zay were a branch of the Harla.

One noted ruler of the Zay dynasty of Wej is Ras Amdu a powerful king who annexed many Muslim provinces, the Abyssinians were so scared of him as well as the Muslims. One chronicle records this statement from the Court of Abyssinia.

“let us also have the Protection of the Muslims so that we can achieve our aims, and bring them in so that our religion may not be changed. But there is Ras Amdu as long as he lived the Moslims are weak and scared.”

In order to weaken him in the eyes of the people the Abyssinian court spread rumour that he slept with Queen Eleni of Abyssinia when the people of Abyssinia heard this Amdu was furious, and he campaigned against the Maya, and Fetegar he in his campaign he invaded the two provinces. According to Tadesse Tamrat he ruled the whole of the Maya, Genz, Fatagar, Wej, and Lake Hayq.

King Eskender supported the Muslims the Negus captured and killed Amdu. When the news spread that the second most powerful monarch of Ethiopia died, Welde Silus, Amdu’s nephew, swore to kill Eskender. After Amdu’s death Welde ascended the throne, under his rule the Maya and Zway we’re subjugated, Welde led his forces to Enderta, Eskender responded by attacking them. Welde’s forcers consisted of Maya archers, which used arrows dipped in poison. He himself killed Eskender. The chronicle states that he swore not to spare the king, this would lead to Fetegar and Wej expanding, Wej and Fetegar invaded the Genz and Ifat province's and took their cattle. Fetegar and Wej became one of the most powerful kingdoms in the Horn of Africa. They would also convert all the inhabitants of Genz and Shewa to islam. Welde moved his capital to Zway then known as Jarecho.

== Ethiopian-Adal War ==
Wej became a Christian kingdom and was later one of the first to be invaded by Ahmad ibn Ibrahim al-Ghazi due to its religion and eastern location. Emperor Lebna Dengel received news of this invasion while at Geberge in Wej, but dismissed the threat as a series of raids. He left the city after appointing Wasan Sagad as king.

Two noblemen of Wej, Azmach Fanil and Yonadab, took prominent roles in holding back the invading forces, and soldiers from the kingdom led a campaign against the Maya, who had recently converted to Islam. Later in Imam Ahmad's invasion, he sent his trusted general and advisor Mojhad to compel Wej to surrender, which it did before he even reached the kingdom. He established a poll tax in the area. After hearing of Mojhad's success, Imam Ahmad traveled to Wej and established a stronghold at Jog.

The current king of Wej, Eslam, had refused to capitulate and retreated to Gurage. However, when Yodab surrendered to Damot, Eslam sent his son and a nobleman named Asebo to make peace. When asked why they had returned, Asebo replied, "We have come to save our country and our churches." They agreed to pay the poll tax in exchange for safety from persecution. Eslam's son became a Muslim, as did all the courtiers and advisors of Wej, but Imam Ahmad allowed Eslam to remain a Christian.
