= Halaba people =

Ethnic group in Ethiopia

Halaba
Languages
- Alaba-Kʼabeena

Religion
- Islam; Christianity

Related ethnic groups
- Harari; Zay; Gurage; Amhara; Tigray; Tigre; other Ethiosemitic peoples

The Halaba people (or Alaba) are an ethnic group inhabiting the central Ethiopian highlands. The Halaba claim to originate from the Arab cleric, Abadir who settled in Harar. In the middle ages, Halaba were part of the Hadiya state. In the 1400s, their Garad (chief) was in conflict with the Abyssinian monarch Zara Yaqob. They are mostly Muslims but there are also some Christians. A map of the region from 1628 shows a Kingdom of Halaba. They speak Halaba-Kʼabeena which is a member of the Highland East Cushitic languages within the Afroasiatic family. Sidi Mohammed the Garad of Hadiya is stated to be a forefather for the Halaba people.

All cultural issues and living conditions are governed by the Halaba People's unique traditional administrative structure, known as Sera, which is interpreted as law, principle, norms, values, and regulation in the community and considered as the New Year celebration of Halaba people.

Every January, following the successful crop harvest, the locals colorfully celebrate the "Sera" holiday to uphold this custom.

== See also ==
- Kebena people
