= Kebena people =

Cushitic ethnic group found in Central, Ethiopia Region

Kebena
Regions with significant populations
- Ethiopia: 450,000

Languages
- Alaba-Kʼabeena

Religion
- mainly Islam

The Kebena people (also spelled Qebena) are a Cushitic ethnic group found in the Gurage Zone of Ethiopia. They speak the Kebena dialect of the Alaba-Kʼabeena language, which is a member of the Highland East Cushitic branch of the Cushitic family group. Kebena were marginalized under the Abyssinian state.

== History ==
The Kebena people live in the Ethiopia predominantly in Kebena Special Woreda with its seat Welkite. They are associated with the 13th century Islamic kingdom of Hadiya and have maintained the designation "Hadiya" to this day Kebena's Garad is mentioned in the fifteenth century Emperor Zara Yaqob chronicle. According to their tradition Kebena originally spoke a Semitic language akin to Silt'e however later shifted to Cushitic Timbaro. In 1815 they split from their closest relatives the Halaba people.

Kebena are also associated with the 19th century state of Kebena or Hadya Womba which became an important commercial and Islamic center in the late 19th to early 20th century . After the fall of the Hadiya kingdom the Kebena people took upon themselves to restore the rule and order in the region under the Islamic sharia which was led by Hassan Enjamo. The Kebena subsist on agriculture. Unlike their southern kinsmen, the Kebena are followers of Islam. Kebena governors of their region were known as Garads, the most notable and last Garad was Hassan Enjamo who led a resistance against Menelik's invasion. The Abyssinian commander Gobana Dacche in the late 19th century is stated to have ravaged the lands of Kebena during his invasion and divided Kebena lands among the Neftenya.

== Demographics ==
Based on the 2007 Census conducted by the CSA, the Kebena group has a total population of 34,379, of whom 17,231 are men and 17,148 women; none of the population were urban inhabitants.

== Religion ==
The majority of the group were reported as Muslim, with 89.52% of the population reporting that belief, while 8.22% practiced Ethiopian Orthodox Christianity, and 1.91% were Protestants.
