= Garad =

Clan leader or chief

Garad (Harari: ገራድ Gärād, Somali: Garaad, Arabic: الجراد, Oromo: Garaada) is a term used to refer to a king, Sultan or regional administrator. It was used primarily by Muslims in the Horn of Africa that were associated with Islamic states, most notably the Adal Sultanate.

== Etymology ==
The origin of the term Garad is uncertain. According to Enrico Cerulli, Garad originates from the era of Adal. Garad denotes a headman within a "Gaar" (clan/house).

Garad denotes a "chief" in Harari and Silt'e languages respectively. Historian Abdurahman Garad states Garad is derived from the Harari term agârada "to observe well" thus closely associated with the uniquely Harari title "Malak". According to Leslau, Garad is a Cushitic loanword in the Harari language. However, linguist Giorgio Banti disputes this claim, stating that Leslau's evidence is not sufficient to support it. Banti adds that there is little proof to support the terms Ethiopian Semitic origin as well.

In the Somali language Garad roughly translates to "chief" or "wise man", as well as "wisdom". Another word origin in the Somali language is Gar Aad, which is the concatenation of the words "justice" and "move towards", therefore the literal meaning of Garad in Somali is "one who seeks justice"

== History ==
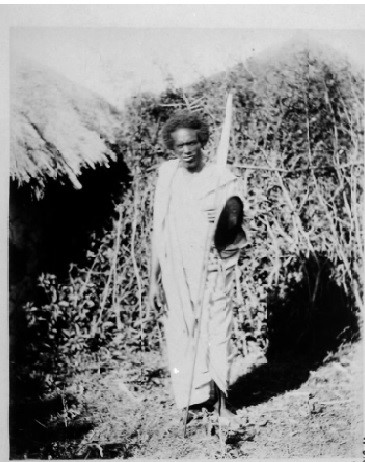
Garad of Ala Oromo in 1885

Several Muslim states and dominions including Hadiya Sultanate, Sultanate of Darfur, Ganz province, Harla and Somali Sultanate leaders were known as Garads.

According to historian Alessandro Gori, both Christian and Islamic texts associate the notable sixteenth century Adal ruler Ahmad ibn Ibrahim al-Ghazi with the title Garad. In the year 1550, a correspondence from the king of Abyssinia to the king of Portugal details the triumph of Adalite leader Garad Ahmed over the Portuguese commander Cristóvão da Gama:

The Captain, D. Christovao, landed from the sea, and entered my country with four hundred Franks, and many bombards and matchlocks and other arms. Numerous Moors collected against him. Our men were few, so that the day was not ours. I did not arrive in time to join the Captain, for I was far away in another country called Seoa. While D. Christovao was in Tigre, he sent me a messenger to ask me to come quickly, as it was necessary that we should both meet. The messenger reached me, he was called Ayres Dias, a servant of the Captain, called by the people of this country Marcos. When I heard the message I began to march in haste, that we might join. On the way I heard that Garad Ahmad had killed D. Christovao and many Franks, and captured all the bombards, munitions, and weapons they had; and that the Franks who escaped were scattered over the country. At this news I was so sorrowful that I wept with sadness and passion.

Within Somali clans the use of the traditional hereditary title "Garad" is most widespread among the Dhulbahante and Karanle and was also used by the Habr Awal up until the 1940s. According to tradition the Somali Girhi's founding Garad "Aboker" lived five centuries ago in Harar. Tradition among the Somali Geledi clan claim Aw Kalafow, a descendant of Abadir, was the first to use the title Garad. Enrico Cerulli and others state that the Harari titles such as Garad were embraced by Somali chiefs.

In the early seventeenth century Emirate of Harar, Garad was the title given to tax collectors on behalf of the state. It was bequeathed and generally transmitted to the eldest son. According to Richard Caulk, Garad was a bygone Harari title that was introduced to the Oromo of Hararghe whom also began using it. Garads were also commanders of the army called the Malassay in the Harar Emirate. An eighteen century Harari chronicle states the Harar region went through major upheavals in the late 1700s which led to the destruction of several villages administrated by Garads.

Between 1831 and 1833, king of Shewa Sahle Selassie appointed al-Hajj Garad of Argobba, the Aliyu Amba governor in the Ifat province of Abyssinia.

== Somali Garad clans ==
There are Somali clans suffixed with Garad, in particular subclans of the Marehan, Dhulbahante, and Karanle which include:

- Farah Garad
- Mohamoud Garad

== Places ==
- Jijiga Gerad Wilwal Airport, airport in Jijiga, Ethiopia
- Garado, city in Wollo Province of Amhara Region derived from Garad.
- Garad Erer, hill overlooking Porc-Epic Cave near Dire Dawa, Ethiopia
- Garad (Garacad), port city in Puntland, Somalia
- Garad Abdal Kader Nur, village near Harar, Ethiopia

== Notable Garads ==
- Mahfuz of Adal Sultanate
- Garad Hirabu Goita Tedros
- Asmadin of Wej
- Abun Adashe of Adal Sultanate
- Dhidhin, first chief of the Somali Warsangali clan
- Abu Bakr Qecchin of Adal Sultanate
- Sidi Mohammed, forefather of the Halaba people
- Matan ibn Uthman Al Somali of Adal Sultanate
- Jama Ali, chief of the Somali Dhulbahante clan
- Hassan Enjamo of the Kebena people
- Aze of Hadiya
- Abdiqani Jama, grand chief of the Dhulbahante clan and one of the signatories of the Somaliland declaration of independence
- Garad Hirsi Farah Hirsi (Wiil Waal), 17th Garad of the Absame

== See also ==
- Ughaz
- Malak
