= Hadiya (historical region) =

Medieval kingdom in southwestern Ethiopia

Hadiya (also known as Adea, Hadia, or Hadya) was a medieval Muslim state in the southern part of its realm located south of Shewa and west of Sharkha regions of the Ethiopian Empire. The Hadiya Muslim state mainly composed of Cushitic Hadiyya proper, Halaba, Kebena people as well as Semitic Sil'te and other tongues related to Harari language. According to their tradition Kebena people also originally spoke a Semitic language but shifted later to Cushitic Timbaro tongue. Hadiya was historically a vassal state of the Adal federation and then became an autonomous province of Abyssinia in the fourteenth century while still remaining a member of the Zeila union. In the 1600s Hadiya regained its independence and was led by a Garad. By 1850, Hadiya was placed north-west of lakes Zway and Langano but still between these areas.

Hadiya was described in the mid-fourteenth century by the Arab historian Shihab Al-Umari as measuring eight days' journey by nine, which Richard Pankhurst estimates was 160 by 180 kilometers. Although small, Hadiya was fertile with fruit and cereals, rich with horses, and its inhabitants used pieces of iron as currency. It could raise an army of 40,000 cavalry and at least twice as many foot soldiers.

== History ==
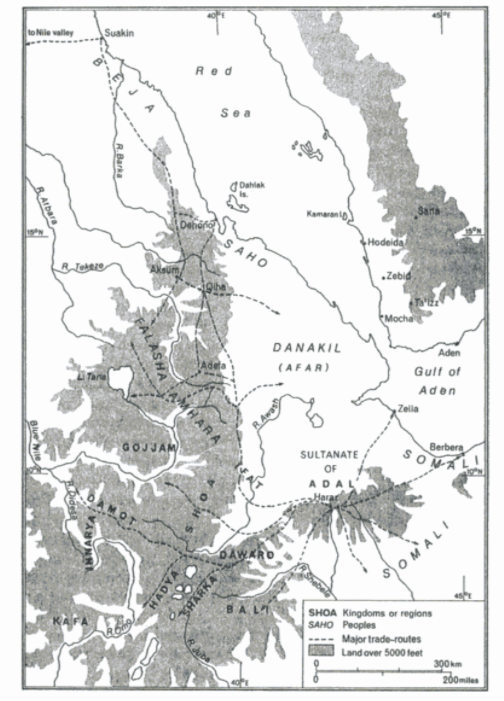
Medieval map of peoples, kingdoms and regions alongside major trade routes in the Horn

Hadiya was likely part of the domain of the Sultanate of Shewa and linked to the Harla. Before the pagan Kingdom of Damot's invasion led by Sidama. A cluster of speakers labelled Hadiya-Sidama developed, maintaining Islamic identity and later creating the Hadiya Sultanate. According to Hadiya elders the dynasty was started by descendants of Harar Emir Abadir, who intermarried with Sidama. The earliest surviving mention of Hadiya is in the Kebra Nagast (ch. 94), indicating that the kingdom was in existence by the 13th century.

Another early mention is in a manuscript written on the island monastery of Lake Hayq, which states that after conquering Damot, Emperor Amda Seyon I proceeded to Hadiya and brought it under his control using Gura armies from modern Eritrea which would later become Gurage region. Later during Amda Seyon's reign, the King of Hadiya, Amano, refused to submit to the Emperor of Ethiopia. Amano was encouraged in this by a Muslim "prophet of darkness" named Bel'am. Amda Seyon subsequently set forth for Hadiya, where he "slew the inhabitants of the country with the point of the sword", killing many of the inhabitants while enslaving others. Despite such punitive measures, many of the Hadiya people served in the military units of Amda Seyon.

In the fourteenth century according to professor Lapiso Gedelebo, the Hadiya state which he designates as "Hadiya-Harla Sultanate" maintained one of the largest armies in the region, consisting of 80,000 infantry and 40,000 cavalry. Arab historian Ibn Fadlallah al-Umari notes that the Hadiya, along with all the other Muslim principalities in the area, were under the authority of the "King of Amhara." They also held a distinct reverence for the ruler of Ifat and, under specific circumstances, lent their support to him.

Medieval Mamluk historian al-Maqrizi describing birds found in Hadiya states:

The Abyssinians have black poultry, and there are wild ones too. Moreover, in Hadiya which belongs to Zayla, there are water fowl which come from the water like ducks, and there as it were are born.'

During the reign of Zara Yaqob, the Garad or Sultan of Hadiya, Mahiko, the son of Garaad Mehmad, repeated his predecessor's actions and refused to pay tribute to the Ethiopian Emperor. However, with the help of one of Mahiko's followers, the Garaad was deposed in favor of his uncle Bamo. Garaad Mahiko then sought sanctuary at the court of the Adal Sultanate. He was later slain by the military contingent Adal Mabrak, who had been in pursuit. The chronicles record that the Adal Mabrak sent Mahiko's head and limbs to Zara Yaqob as proof of his death. Zara Yaqob turned away from the policy of expansion to that of consolidating what had been won so far. He organized the administration of the empire by appointing his relatives to the highest posts. He initiated the policy of appointing Christians in the peripheral Muslim territories, he instituted the practice of converting and marrying Hadiya princesses most notably Eleni of Ethiopia, which was denounced by Muslims in the region. According to British historian Richard Pankhurst's historical analysis, tension between Adal and Abyssinia had begun to fester following the Abyssinian emperors' matrimonial union with Hadiya Princess Eleni which constituted an adversarial measure designed to undermine the strategic alliance between Adal and Hadiya. Adal attempted to invade Ethiopia in response, however the campaign was a disaster and led to the death of Sultan Badlay ibn Sa'ad ad-Din at the Battle of Gomit.

Hadiya was later visited by the Portuguese traveler Francisco Álvares, he described it as "very wooded", so much so that one "could not travel without cutting trees and making roads." He claim that it produced large amounts of cattle to which it used to pay tribute to the Emperor Dawit II. Despite its inhabitants being Muslims, he described them as "very peaceful" and subservient to the Emperor. Lebna Dengel lists it in his letter to Manuel I of Portugal as being a part of his realm.

In the medieval period gold and slaves were acquired by Muslim traders to the Kingdom of Damot and the Hadiya Sultanate, who were known for slave raiding, to the Christian Amhara who (during that time) opposed castration. The next time Hadiya is mentioned is in the sixteenth century Adal texts written by Arab Faqīh called the Futuh al-Habasa, the history of the conquests of Imam Ahmad ibn Ibrahim al-Ghazi. Just prior to arriving in the province, the unnamed governor addressed the Imam and declared "I am a Muslim, like you, I will obey your orders." The Imam was said to have received a warm welcome and hospitality from the Muslim populace. The inhabitants then informed the Imam of the oppression their people had to endure under the Emperor, "He was stronger than us; he forbade us carry defensive arms, hold swords or ride on saddled horses, allowing us only to ride bareback; he imposed on us the obligation of giving him each year a young girl, which we do for fear that he will kill us and destroy our mosques." The Imam told the people of Hadiya to have no more fear and called upon them to join his struggle against the Christians. After staying in Hadiya for five days, the Imam then left the province, taking with him the governor and his brother. The lord of Hadiya later gave his daughter Mureyas to the Imam, who died 3 months later.

Emperor Sarsa Dengel suppressed a rebellion by Hadiya leader Garad Aze at the Battle of Hadiya. In the 1600s the Garad of Hadiya Sidi Mohammed defeated the troops of Emperor Susenyos I thus protecting their frontier from Abyssinian annexation for the next three hundred years. In the late sixteenth century, some parts of the Hadiya region was overrun by the Oromo expansion, thus, the Arsi Oromo today claim Hadiya ancestry. In 1613, Fernandez, a Portuguese explorer, was momentarily held upon his entry into the territory of the Halaba-Hadiya kingdom, and subsequently released following his agreement to return to Abyssinia. In 1751 Czech missionary Remedius Prutky upon his visit to Abyssinia mentions the Kingdom of Hadiya being located to its south and confined by Adal's western border.

The Hadiya Muslim cluster state existed until the Abyssinian invasion under Menelik II in the 1800s. The Hadiya state of Qabeena under imam Umar Baksa capitulated to the Abyssinians without resistance due to fears of a direct occupation in 1875. This was opposed by nobles especially the Garad of Qabeena at the time Hassan Enjamo who began a resistance movement. In the following years, Hassan would expand his dominion into all of Hadiya, some part of Gurage and Oromo territory. Hassan was however defeated in 1889 at the battle of Jabdu Meda leading to Qabeena Hadiya states annexation by the Abyssinians. Soldiers that fought under Hassan's Hadiya army such as Balcha Safo and Habte Giyorgis Dinagde would later switch allegiance, and become part of the Abyssinian aristocracy. The Halaba Hadiya under their chief Barre Kagaw continued to resist until 1893 when the Abyssinians took advantage of the famine that had struck the region and led a conquest into their territory.

== Identity ==
Historical definition of Hadiya people includes a number of Ethiopian ethnic groups currently known by other names according to ethnologist Ulrich Braukämper, who lived in various parts of southern-central Ethiopia for over four years during his research. In his book titled "A history of the Hadiyya in Southern Ethiopia", he established linkages to the ancient Hadiya Kingdom. Currently, Hadiya is not a homogeneous ethnic group but is rather sub-divided into a number of ethnonyms, partly with different languages and cultural affiliations. They were initially all inhabitants of a single political entity, a Sultanate, which in the 4th centuries following its break-down became remarkably diverse. The Libidoo (Maräqo), Leemo, Sooro, Shaashoogo, and Baadawwaachcho remained a language entity and preserved an identity of oneness, the Hadiya proper. The term Hadiya specifically designates the Qabeena people. Other ethnic groups such as Siltʼe, Wulbareg, Azarnat, Barbare, Wuriro, Wolane and Gadabano profess that they're the seven Hadiya clans. Ancient Hadiyans are distinguished by their Muslim heritage however these populations have decreased in the following centuries. There are clans of Hadiyya origin in Welayta as well as descendants of an old Hadiya stratum living with the Oromo and Sidama. Hadiya are related to the Harari.

== Connection to the Hawiye ==
Some historical and linguistic analyses suggest that the name Hawiye, a major Somali clan family, may also derive from the historical Hadiya region or its people, reflecting the medieval interactions and population movements between the Ethiopian interior and the Horn of Africa coast. The tomb of Sheikh Hawiye is situated in Kundudo, near the historical Hadiya region.

== Famous members ==
- Eleni of Ethiopia
- Garad Aze
- Garad Side Mohammed
- Garad Hassan Enjamo
- Garaad Amano
- Garaad Mehmad
- Garaad Mahiko
- Garaad Bamo

== See also ==
- Silte people
- Silte Zone
- Silte language
