= Bartire =

Somali clan

بارتري

Languages
- Somali

Religion
- Islam (Sunni)

Related ethnic groups
- Abaskuul, Ogaden, Absame, Darod, and other Somali clans

The Bartire (Somali: Bartirre, Arabic: بارتري), (or Barre Jidwaaq Absame) are a Somali sub clan, part of the Jidwaq of the major Absame branch, which whom belongs to the Darod clan. One of the largest Somali tribe-families.

== Overview ==
Members of the Bartire clan primarily inhabit in the Somali Region of Ethiopia's fertile and agricultural land. They reside near the city of Jigjiga stretching to the lower Fafan and upper parts of Jarar. Living in these regions alongside the Abaskuul and Yabaree, which whom they make up Jidwaaq. The Bartire also live in Somalia, mainly in the southern region of Jubaland in the city of Bu'ale, and in Xagar near the city Kismayo. They also share borders with the Ogaden clan and Habar Awal of the Isaaq clan. Traditionally Jigjiga is the seat of the Bartire Garad Wiil-Waal.

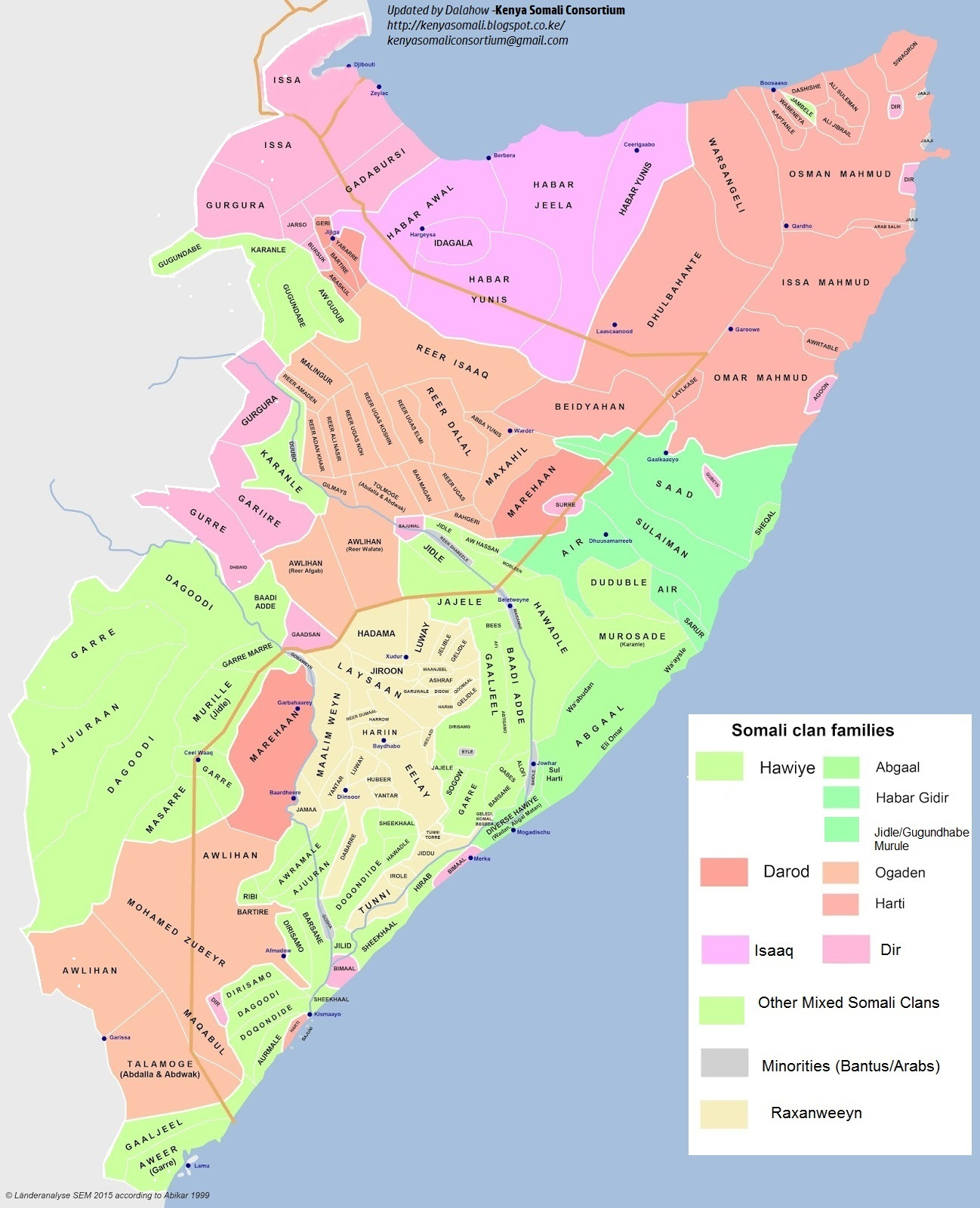
NRC clan map of Greater Somalia.

== History ==
The Habr Maqdi was a Somali confederation made up of the sub-clans Bartire and Yabaree, and is now part of the Jidwaaq. Both sub-clans are explicitly referenced in Futuh al-Habasha. As noted by the French contemporary writer, Amelia Checkroun;

Some clans are subdivided into "sub-clans", like the Bartirri which united the Habr Maqdi and the Gawätir. There does not seem to be any Somali authority bringing together all the clans under one command. So when a conflict breaks out between two clans, they turn to the authority of the imam."

The Bartire around the time of Adal Sultanate dynasty, fought in the Ethiopian-Adal War. They were known for having a large army along with the Yabaree. They were also loyal to Imam Ahmed Gurey. During the Conquest of Abyssinia the sub-clans that composed Habar Maqdi frequently divided into two military factions. Ahmed Girri bin Hussein led the Yabaree sub-clan, while the Bartire sub-clan was commanded by a Malassay chief named Garad Dhaweyd. Arab Faqih confirms that Habar Maqdi included members of the Bartire.

"Then he split his force into three divisions. The first consisted of the people of Sim, the tribe of Marraihan and Bar Tarri which are the Habr Maqdi and the people of Jawatir: they were under the command of the wazir 'Addol."

It is well-documented that the Bartire sub-clan of the Habar Maqdi controlled the trade and caravan route to Berbera. Renowned for his African travels a British explorer, scholar and soldier, Richard Burton highlighted the Bartire clan's longstanding connections with the Emirs of Harar. The military officer writes;

The Berteri, who occupy the Gurays Range, south of, and limitrophe to, the Gallas, and thence extend eastward to the Jigjiga hills, are estimated at 3000 shields. Of Darud origin, they own allegiance to the Gerad Hirsi, and were, when I visited the country, on bad terms with the Girhi. The chiefs family has, for several generations, been connected with the Amir's of Harar, and the caravan's route to and from Berberah lying through his country, makes him a useful friend and a dangerous foe.

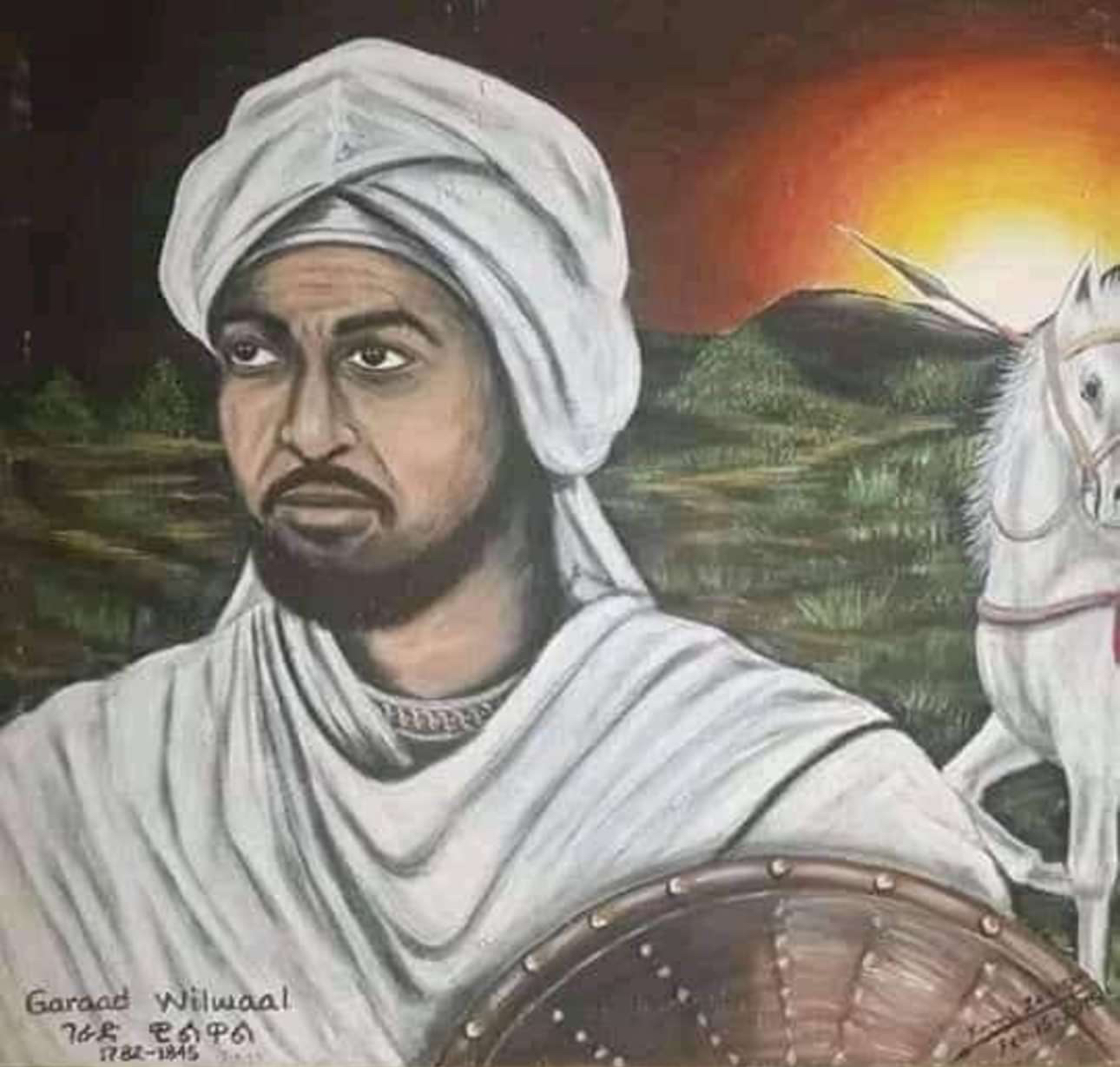
Garad Hirsi Garad Farah Garad Hirsi Garad Wiil Waal (Wiil-Waal), 17th Garad of the Absame.

Garad Hirsi Farah Hirsi, or better known as Garad Wiil Waal (Somali: Garaad Xirsi Faraax Xirsi Wiil-Waal, Amharic: ገራድ ዊልዋል). Garad Wiil Waal was a traditional Somali king who lived during the 19th century in Jigjiga. He hailed from the Bartire Jidwaaq sub-clan of the major Darod tribe family. According to historical records Garad Hirsi Farah Hirsi was a man of strong judgment and wisdom. However, he was also characterized as cruel and unforgiving, earning him the nickname "Wiil-Waal," which, when translated literally from Somali, means "Crazy Boy." He was a leader who spent most of his life in constant raids and defenses. He ruled and liberated the Somalis from the Galla Oromos in which is now a part of Jigjiga and its surrounding areas.

About the Gerad Hirsi different reports were rife: some described him as cruel, violent, and avaricious; others spoke of him as a godly (man) and a prayerful person: all, however, agreed that he had sowed wild oats. In token of re-pentance, he was fond of feeding Widads, and the Shaykh Jami of Harar was a frequent guest at his kraal.

The story of Wiil Waal has been turned into a bilingual (English and Somali) children's picture book under the "Somali Bilingual Book Project" Wiil Waal: A Somali Folktale by Kathleen Moriarty, with illustrations by Amin Amir and translation by Jamal Adam. It's aimed at teaching about Somali culture, wisdom, and the importance of clever thinking.

== Lineage ==
There is no clear agreement on the clan and sub-clan structures, and many lineages are omitted. The following listing is taken from the World Bank's Conflict in Somalia: Drivers and Dynamics from 2005 and the United Kingdom's Home Office publication, Somalia Assessment 2001.

- Darod (Daarood bin Isma'il al-Jabarti)
  - Kablalah
    - Kumade
      - Absame
        - Ogaden
        - Bal'ad
        - Weytein
        - Jidwaaq
          - Abaskuul
          - Yabaree
          - (Bartire)

== Notable figures ==
- Garad Kulmiye Mohammed Dool (Wiil-Waal), The current Garad of the Absame and leader of the Somali Region Council of Elders.
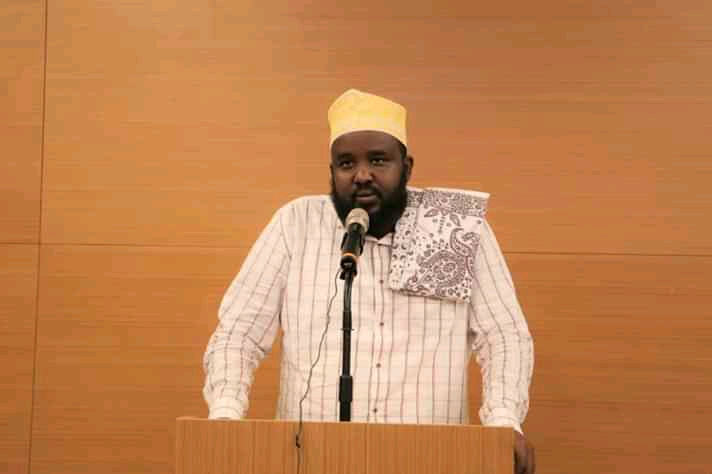
  Garad Kulmiye Garad Mohammed Garad Dool.
- Hasan Muhumed (Xasan Daadhi), Former Minister of Water Resources for the Somali Region.
- Ahmed Shugri Abdi Farah ( Ahmed Shugri) The Current Ministry of Urban Development and Construction of the Somali Regional State (SRS).
- Garad Hirsi Farah Hirsi (Wiil-Waal), Ruler, The 17th Bartire Garad of the Absame. The Jigjiga Airport (JIJ) is named after him.

== See also ==
- Darod
- Jidwaaq
- Habr Maqdi
