= Darod =

Somali clan family

Darod Daarood
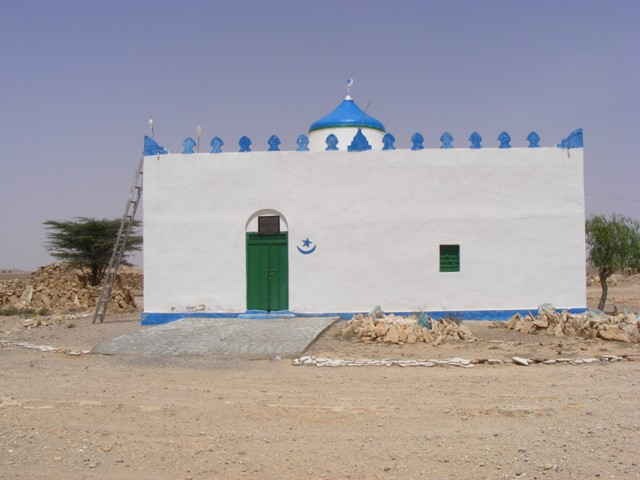
- The tomb of Sheikh Darod in Haylan, Sanaag.
- Ethnicity: Somali
- Location: Somalia; Ethiopia; Kenya; Yemen; Oman
- Descended from: Abdirahman bin Isma'il al-Jabarti
- Branches: Muhammad (Kablalah); Yousuf (Awrtable); Hussein (Tanade); Ahmad (Sade); Eissa (Cisse)
- Language: Somali Arabic
- Religion: Sunni Islam

The Darod (Somali: Daarood) is a Somali clan. The semi-legendary forefather of this clan is Abdirahman bin Isma'il al-Jabarti, more commonly known as Darod. The clan primarily settles the apex of the Horn of Africa and its peripheries, Ogaden and both sides of the Kenya–Somalia border. The Darod clan is the largest Somali clan family in the Horn of Africa.

== Origins ==
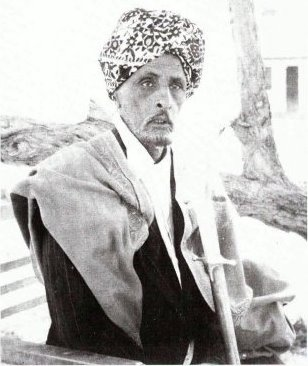
Mohamoud Ali Shire, leader of the Warsangali. Warsangali are a subclan of the Darod.

According to Somali tradition, Abu Talib ibn Abd al-Muttalib's semi-legendary descendant Abdirahman bin Isma'il al-Jabarti (Darod), a son of the Sufi Sheikh Isma'il al-Jabarti of the Qadiriyyah order, fled his homeland in the Arabian Peninsula after an argument with his uncle. During the 10th or 11th century CE, Abdirahman is believed to have then settled in modern-day Sanaag just across the Red Sea and married Dobira, the daughter of the Dir clan chief. This union is said to have given rise to the Darod clan family. Thus, it established matrilateral ties with the Samaale main stem.

Despite this, scholarly sources regard the narrative as a genealogical fabrication, noting that the pre-Islamic name Darod suggests an originally Cushitic personage who was later ennobled as a Muslim saint.

=== Gidaya kingdom (12th century) ===
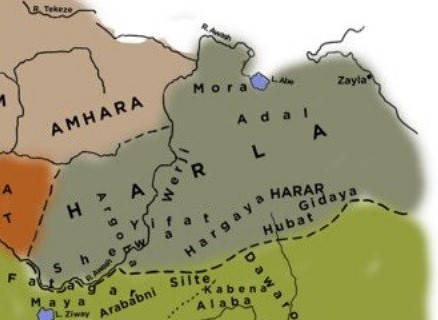

Contemporary writers confirm that Gidaya kingdom is associated with Geri clan of the Somali mentioned in the Futuh al-Habasha who today live around Jigjiga, the presumed location of Gidaya state.

Gidaya rose to prominence due their inland interior trade which extended as far as modern day Addis Ababa, this corresponds well with the findings of British archeologists confirming that Somali groups dominated the Ethiopian highland In the thirteenth century the Arab writer al-Mufaḍḍal mentions a Geri King of Gidaya extending his authority as far as Shewa. A later Geri ruler known as Sihab al-Din Gidaya Girri is identified as the lord and principal ruler of Gidaya. According to Dr. Lapiso Delebo the Gidaya Kingdom was one of the Islamic states that had rapidly developed in the Horn of Africa from the ninth to fourteenth centuries Sixteenth century Adal writer Arab Faqīh, notes that the Gidaya Kingdom were part of the army of Ahmad ibn Ibrahim al-Ghazi during the Ethiopian-Adal war

According to the British anthropologist and Somali Studies veteran Ioan Lewis, the traditions of descent from noble Arab families related to the Prophet are most probably figurative expressions of the importance of Islam in Somali society. However, "there is a strong historically valid component in these legends which, in the case of the Darod, is confirmed in the current practice of a Dir representative officiating at the ceremony of installation of the chief of the Darod family."

There are also numerous existing hagiologies in Arabic which describe Sheikh Darod's travels, works and overall life in northern Somalia, as well as his movements in Arabia before his arrival. Besides historical sources such as Al-Masudi's Aqeeliyoon, a modern manaaqib (a collection of glorious deeds) printed in Cairo in 1945 by Sheikh Ahmad bin Hussen bin Mahammad titled Manaaqib as-Sheikh Ismaa'iil bin Ibraahiim al-Jabarti also discusses Sheikh Darod and his proposed father Isma'il al-Jabarti, the latter of whom is reportedly buried in Bab Siham in the Zabid District of western Yemen.

Sheikh Darod's own tomb is in Haylaan, situated in the Sanaag region of Somalia, and is the scene of frequent pilgrimages. Sheikh Isaaq is buried nearby in Maydh, as is Sheikh Harti, a descendant of Sheikh Darod and the progenitor of the Harti Darod sub-clan, whose tomb lies in the ancient town of Qa’ableh. Sheikh Darod's mawlid (birthday) is also celebrated every Friday with a public reading of his manaaqib.

The Harti were supporters of their cousin Imam Ahmad ibn Ibrahim al-Ghazi, who is reported to be from the Geri Kombe clany

Somali tribes, especially the Geri koombe of the Darod clan who became his immediate in-laws, were lined up behind him supporting him every step of the way

I.M Lewis states:

Somali contingents played a notable part in the Imam's victories and Shihab ad-Din, the Muslim chronicler of the period writing between 1540 and 1560, mentions them frequently. Most prominent were the Darod clans of the Harti faction who were now in possession of the ancient port of Mait in the east, and expanding westwards and southwards from this centre. This Darod support was reinforced by ties of marriage, for the Imam was related by marriage to one of the Darod leaders.

This is especially true with the Geri Koombe who were in-laws with Imam Ahmed. Garad Matan married Imam Ahmed's sister who her name was Fardawsa. Garad Matan being the chieftain of Geri Koombe supported the Jihad and served as an Adalite general, second in command to Imam Ahmed.

He also sent a messenger to the tribe of Girri which was the tribe whose leader and chieftain was Mattan bin 'Utman bin Kaled, the Somali, his brother-in-law who was one of the heroic and gracious knights who died as a martyr in the battle for the Amba as will be recalled at some length later on. The storyteller, may God have mercy upon him, says: On the left was the Somali tribe of Harti, from the people of Mait; a people not given to yielding. There were three-hundred of them, famous among the infantry as stolid swordsmen. In the same way there was the tribe of Yibberi, around four-hundred infantrymen, archers. So the imam attached them to the five-hundred who held the centre, saying to them, 'Hold your positions; don't budge, anyone of you.' The tribe of Girri were all horsemen, renowned as riders.

The Geri Koombe tribe played a pivotal role in leadership, Garad Matan ibn Uthman Al Somali was described by chronicler Shihāb al-Dīn as one of the most bravest and courageous military commanders in the Adal Sultanate. The Imam had gathered all the Somali tribes and entrusted them to his brother in law Garad Matan ibn Uthman Al Somali.

After that the Muslims stood their ground. The tribe of the Somali said it was the tribe of Harla that gave us away while the tribe of Harla said it was the Somali tribe that gave us away The imam split his forces into three divisions: all the Somalis were in one division whose command he entrusted to Mattan.

Shihāb al-Dīn notes that Harti soldiers took part in the Adal Sultanate army. Hamza al Jufi was an infantry leader during the Battle of Shimbra Kure. The writer Arab Faqih attributes to him bravery and courage. Hamza al Jufi was described as eager and could not restrain himself until the Adalites had to hold him back, telling him to "be patient". Arab Faqih goes on to describe the Harti just like Hamza al Jufi, recognising the bravery of the Somalis. He describes them as “famous among the infantry as solid swordsmen, and a people not given to yielding.”

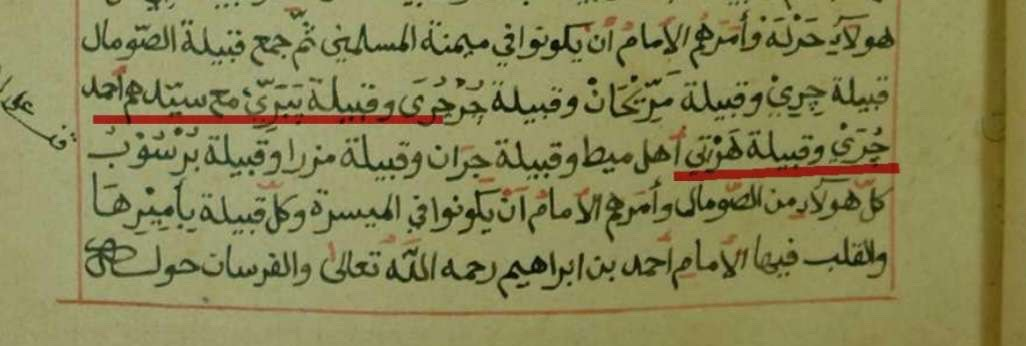
16th century manuscript showing Ahmed Girri Bin Hussein leading the Yabarray division of Habr Maqdi. The text underlined in red translates to “The tribe of Yabirray with their leader Ahmed Girri". As the only primary source on Ahmed Girri Bin Hussein and the Futuh Wars, this definitely illustrates the identity of Ahmed Girri as not only Somali, but also of the Jidwaaq Absame branch of the Darod clan.

The Marehan clan are recorded as having played the biggest role in Imam Ahmad ibn Ibrahim al-Ghazi's campaigns against the Ethiopian Empire during the 16th century. Imam Ahmad himself, alongside his successor Emir Nur ibn Al-Mujahid, as well as Garad Hirabu Goita Tedros all hailed from the Marehan clan. Along with the Habr Maqdi of the Jidwaaq; they helped push westward the enemies into the plains of Shewa and farther, helping destabilize the highland Christian empire. Evident in these battles were the Somali archers, namely the Marehan.

== Lineage ==
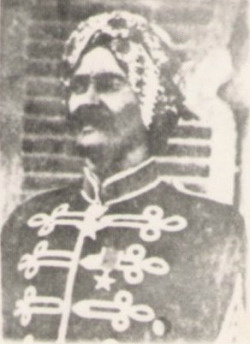
Sultan Ali Yusuf Kenadid of the Sultanate of Hobyo, from the Majerteen Darod lineage.

Darod is the son of the famous Arabian Sheikh, Ismail bin Ibrahim Al-Jabarti, who is buried in the Zabid District of Yemen. He is believed to have been a descendant of Aqeel ibn Abi Talib who in turn hailed from the Quraysh, a historically significant Arab tribe that the final prophet of Islam Muhammed was from. In 2009, former President of Somalia, Abdullahi Yusuf visited the grave of Ismail bin Ibrahim Al-Jabarti in Yemen.

According to many medieval and modern Islamic historians, Darod is descended from Aqeel ibn Abi Talib, the cousin of Muhammad and brother of Ali ibn Abi Talib. An ancient Islamic history book, called Aqeeliyoon by Al-Masudi, talks in detail about the descendants of Aqeel ibn Abi Talib, wherein Darod is also mentioned. The book gives Sheikh Darod's lineage as Abdirahmaan Bin Ismaa'iil Bin Ibraahim Bin Abdirahmaan Bin Muhammed Bin Abdi Samad Bin Hanbal Bin Mahdi Bin Ahmed Bin Abdalle Bin Muhammed Bin Aqail Bin Abu-Talib Bin Abdul-Mutalib Bin Hashim Bin Qusaya.

According to Allaa'i Alsuniyah Fi Al-Aqab Al-Aqeeliyah (2006) by Ahmed bin Ali Al-Rajihi Al-Aqeeli, the lineage of Sheikh Darod/Da'ud is: "Da'ud ibn Ismail ibn Ibrahim ibn Abdulsamad ibn Ahmed ibn Abdallah ibn Ahmed Ibn Ismail ibn Ibrahim ibn Abdallah ibn Isma'il ibn Ali ibn Abdallah ibn Muhammad ibn Hamid ibn Abdallah ibn Ibrahim ibn Ali ibn Ahmed ibn Abdallah ibn Muslim ibn Abdallah ibn Muhammad ibn Aqeel ibn Abi-Talib Al-Hashimi Al-Qurashi". Al-Aqeeli adds that Sheikh Isma'il's sons include Abi-Bakar, Da'ud, Ahmad and Abdulsamad, whose other offspring inhabit the Hadhramaut and Mahra regions in Southern Arabia.

== Distribution ==
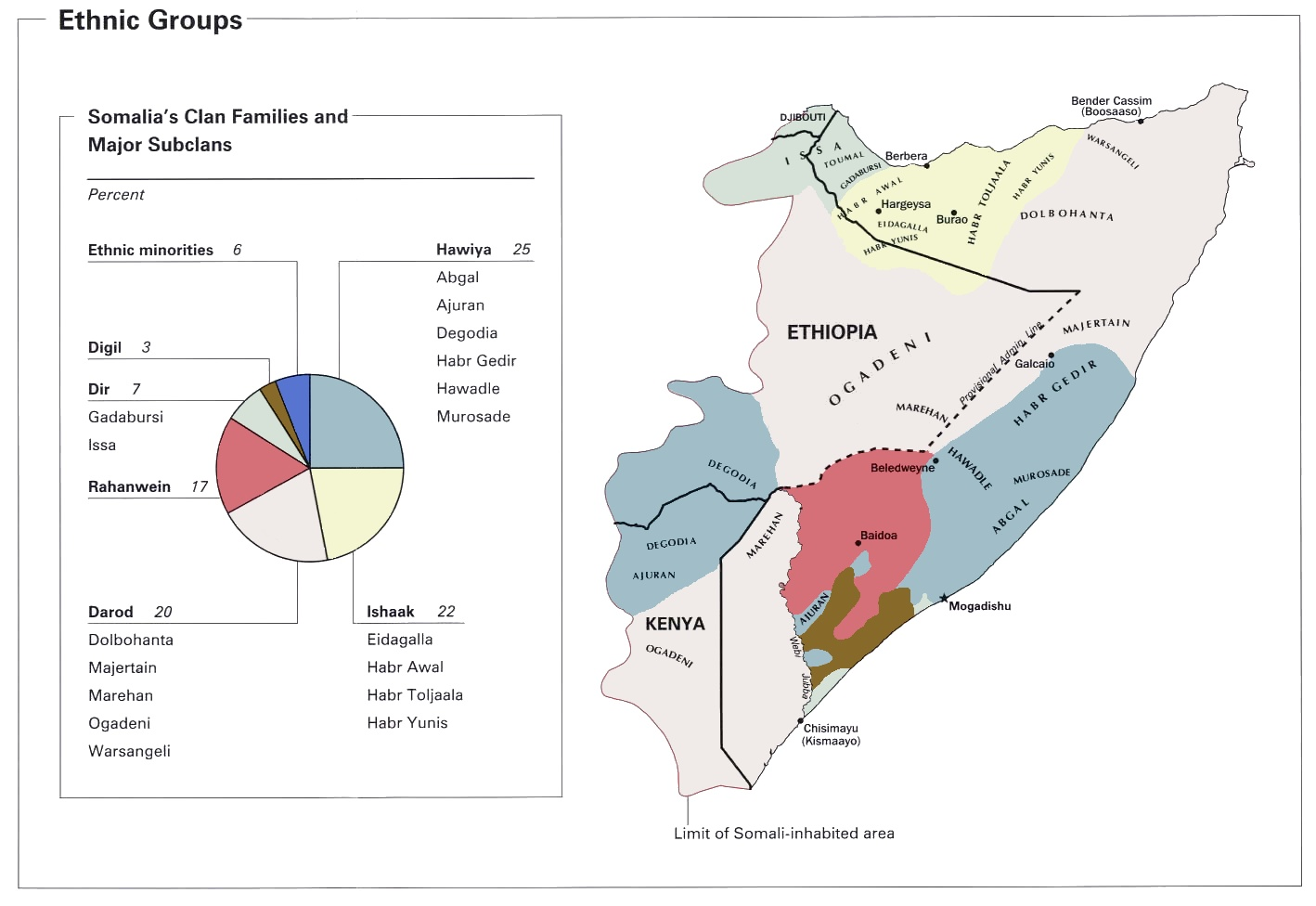
Traditional territory inhabited by the various Somali clans shown

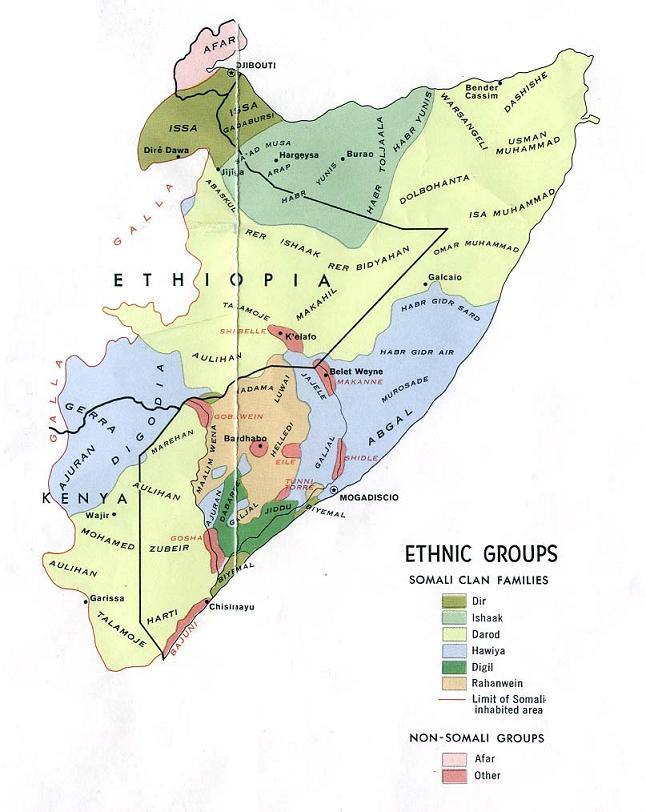
Traditional Somali tribes' territories 1977

The Darod are believed to be a large Somali clan both in terms of population size and land inhabitation. The Darod constitute a big presence in the Somali Region of Ethiopia and are also one of the largest Somali clan in North Eastern Province of Kenya. Within Somalia, the Darod are also one of the largest clans, with traditional strongholds in the north, modern day Puntland state which is dominated by the Harti subclan of Darod. In addition, the Marehan, Ogaden, Jidwaaq, and Harti Darod members are also settled further down south in the Gedo region as well as the Middle Jubba and Lower Jubba regions of Somalia. The Darod in Somalia, roughly corresponds to the Darod's settled within the Jubbaland and Puntland states. In northern Somalia, the Darod settle in Sool, Sanaag regions and the cayn regions.

Major Darod Settlements within Somalia include Galkacyo, Kismaayo, Bosaso, and Garowe.

Darod are also the largest clan in Jigjiga in Ethiopia, and Garissa in Northern Kenya.

== Nobility ==
The Darod clan has produced numerous noble Somali men and women over the centuries, including many Sultans. Traditionally, the Darod population was mostly concentrated in the northern and northeastern cities across the Gulf of Aden and upper Indian Ocean coast in the Horn of Africa. Darod noble men ruled these settlement pockets until the European colonial powers changed the political dynamics of Somalia during the late 19th century. Before many Darods began pushing southward in the mid-1850s, the Majeerteen Sultanate and Sultanate of Hobyo held steadfast in solidly established posts from Alula to Hobyo.

== Clan tree ==
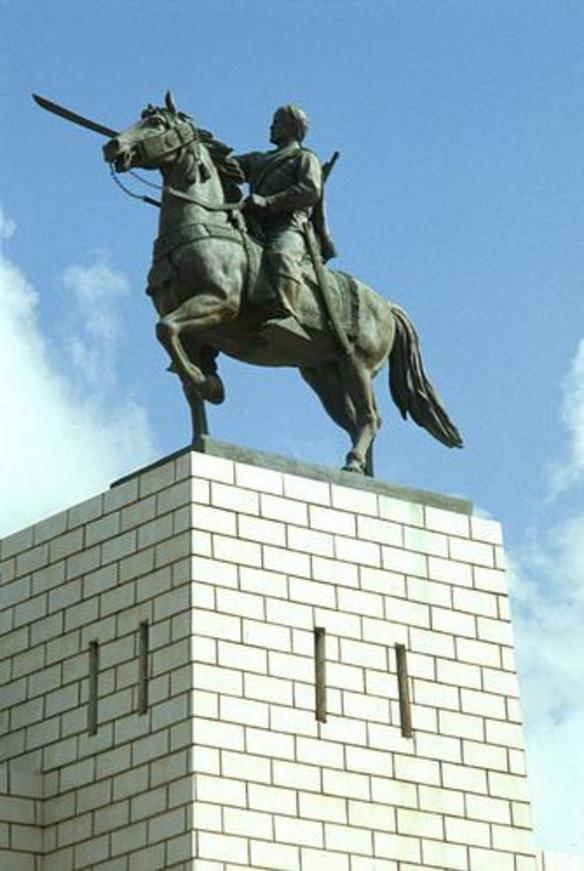
Statue of Mohammed Abdullah Hassan (or Mad Mullah), leader of the Dervish movement.

There is no clear agreement on the clan and sub-clan structures and many lineages are omitted. The following listing is based upon the World Bank's Conflict in Somalia: Drivers and Dynamics from 2005 and the United Kingdom's Home Office publication, Somalia Assessment 2001.

- Darod (Daarood)
  - Cisse
  - Sade
    - Marehan
      - Reer Dini
      - Reer Hassan
      - Eli Dheere
    - Facaaye
  - Tanade
    - Leelkase
  - Yusuf
    - Awrtable
  - Kablalah
    - Absame
      - Bal’ad
      - Weytein
      - Ogaden
        - Makabul
        - Tolomoge
        - Mohamed Zubeir
        - Bahgari
        - Aulihan
      - Jidwaaq
        - Bartire
        - Abaskuul
        - Yabarre
    - Koombe (Kombe)
      - Geri Koombe
        - Abba Yonis Hassan
        - Ishaaq Hassan
        - Umar Hassan
        - Yusuf Hassan
      - Jairan
      - Harla
      - Harti
        - Dishiishe (Dishishe)
        - Warsangali (Warsengeli)
        - Majeerteen (Mijerteen)
          - Wabeeneeye
          - Bicidyahan
          - Siwaaqroon
          - Ali Saleeban
          - Ugaar Saleebaan
          - Mohamoud Saleeban
            - Omar Mohamoud
            - Isse Mohamoud
            - Osman Mohamoud
        - Dhulbahante (Dolbahante)
          - Mohamoud Garad
            - Jama Siad
            - Galool Oriye
          - Farah Garad
            - Baharsame
            - Barkad
            - Ararsame
            - Bah Ali Gheri
          - Abdi Garad
            - Khayr Abdi
            - Omar Abdi

In the south central part of Somalia the World Bank shows the following clan tree:

- Darod
  - Kablalah
    - Kombe
    - Kumade
  - Cisse (Isse)
  - Sade
    - Marehan
    - Facaye
  - Awrtable
  - Leelkase (Lelkase)

One tradition maintains that Darod had one daughter.

== Darod's tomb ==
Darod is buried in an old town called Haylaan near Badhan in the north-eastern Sanaag region of Somalia. His wife Dobira is buried just outside the town. The surrounding buildings and the mosque near the tomb was built by the former president of Somalia Abdullahi Yusuf.

Darod is believed to be the son of the famous Arabian Sheikh, Ismail bin Ibrahim Al-Jabarti, who is buried in the Zabid District of Yemen. Tradition holds that he is descended from the Banu Hashim.

In 2009, former President of Somalia, Abdullahi Yusuf visited the grave of Ismail bin Ibrahim Al-Jabarti in Yemen

Sheikh Darod's mawlid (birthday) is celebrated every Friday with a public reading of his manaqib and passages in the Quran.

== Sons of Sheikh Darod Ismail ==
- Ahmad bin Abdirahman: Sade Darod
- Muhammad bin Abdirahman: Kablalax Darod
- Hussien bin Abdirahman: Tanade Darod
- Yousuf bin Abdirahman: Awrtable Darod
- Eissa bin Abdirahman: Cisse Darod

== Notable Darod people ==
=== Royalty ===
- Ahmed Girri Bin Hussein Al Somali, Jidwaaq Absame, 16th century Adalite Leader
- Garad Matan Bin Uthman Bin Khalid 16th century Adalite General
- Imam Ahmed I Ibrahim Al Ghazi, Geri Koombe, de facto Adal ruler
- Ali Yusuf Kenadid, Majerteen, Last Sultan of the Sultanate of Hobyo

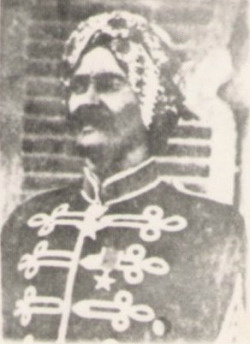
Ali Yusuf Kenadid, second sultan of the Sultanate of Hobyo

- Mohamoud Ali Shire, Warsangeli, Sultan of former "British Somaliland" (1897–1960)
- Ugas Yasin Ugas Abdurahman former ruler of Bosaso
- Ali Yusuf Kenadid, Majerteen, Last Sultan of the Sultanate of Hobyo

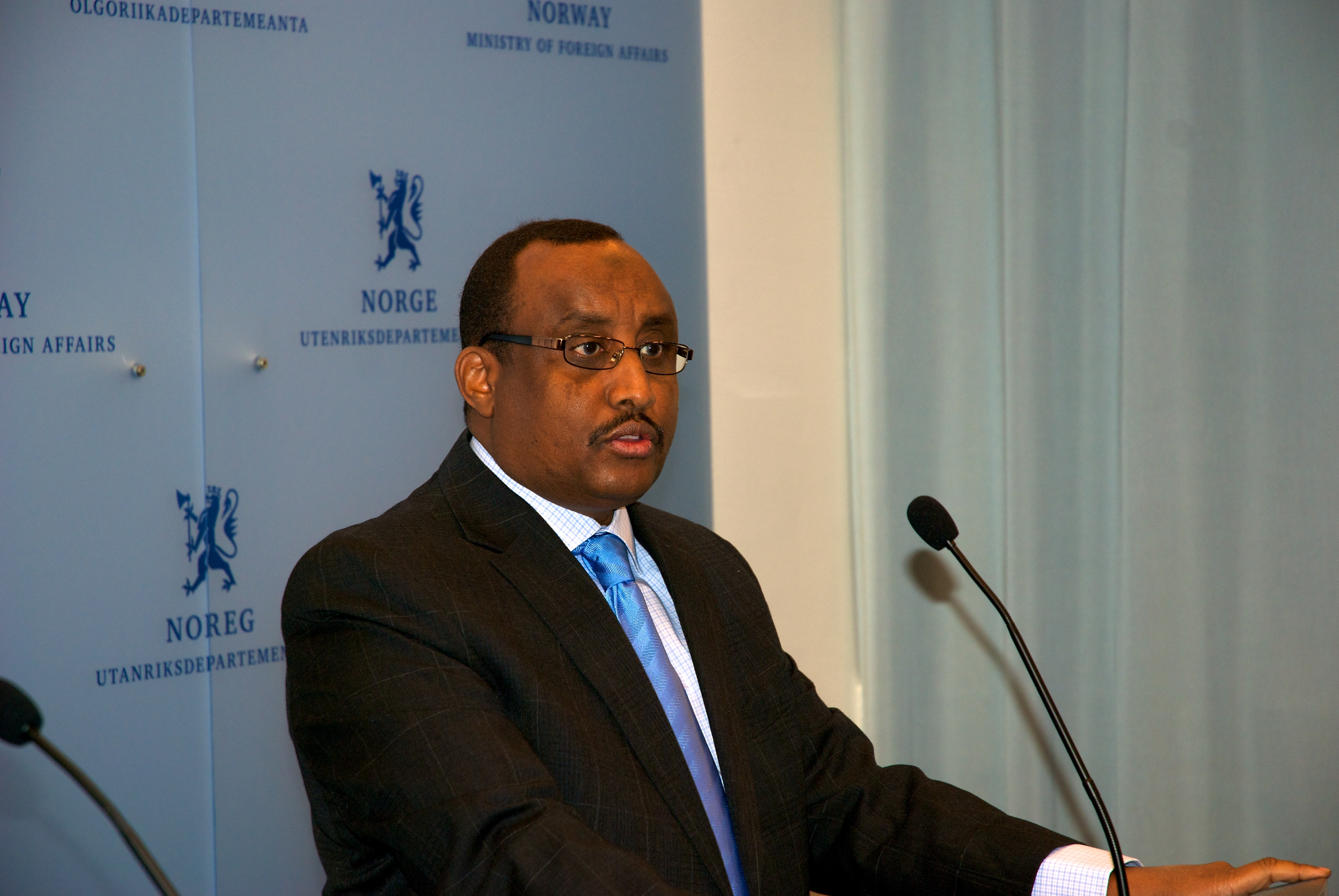
Abdiweli Gaas, former president of Puntland

- Xasan Deyl, chief caaqil of Bah Cali Gheri during independence
- Garaad Abdulahi Garaad Soofe, first chief caaqil of Bah Cali Gheri in 21st century
- Yuusuf Kooreeye, chief caaqil of Ararsame during and prior to independence
- Omar Amey, the chief caaqil of Ararsame during colonialism
- Garaad Kulmiye Garad Mohammed Garad Dool Garaad Wiil Waal, Bartire, the current chief of the Absame.
- Garad Adan Bin Kooshin, Supreme Garad of Geri Koombe 19th Century

=== Rulers ===
- Garad Hirsi Farah Hirsi | Wiil-Waal | Bartire, Somali ruler who liberated Jigjiga from the Oromo invaders in the early 1800s.
- Mohammed Abdullah Hassan, Ogaden, the Sayyid / Mad Mullah; religious and nationalist leader of the Dervish movement.
- Nur ibn Mujahid, Marehan, second Conqueror of Ethiopia and the Patron Saint of Harar was one of rulers of parts of the Horn of Africa.
- Siad Barre, Marehan, third President of Somalia, 1969–1991

=== Inventors and founders ===
- Osman Yusuf Kenadid, Majerteen, Inventor of the Osmanya Script.
- Shire Jama Ahmed, Marehan, inventor of the Somali script
- Haji Bashir Ismail Yusuf, Majeerteen, first president of Somali National Assembly; former Minister of Health and Labor of Somalia (1966–67)

=== Lawyers and legislators ===
- Ahmed Sheikh Ali Ahmed, Marehan former president of Court of Appeal, Somali Democratic Republic.
- Ahmed Hussen, Majeerteen, Minister of Immigration of Canada
- Abdulqawi Yusuf, Majerteen, prominent Somali international lawyer and president on the International Court of Justice.
- Ilhan Omar, Majerteen, member of the Minnesota House of Representatives
- Mohamud Ali Magan, Marehan, Somali Foreign Affairs, Consul General to United States Of America and Canada
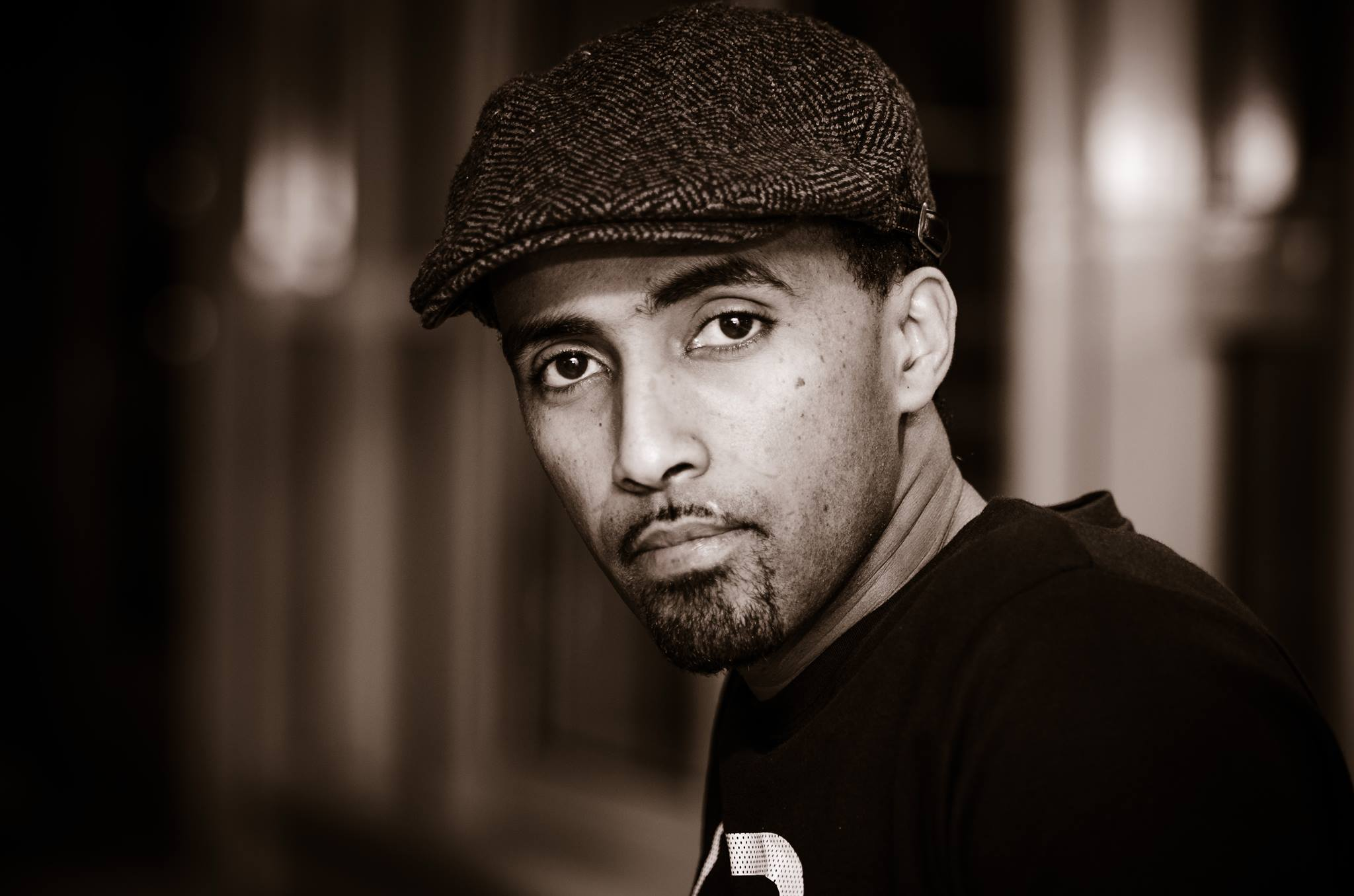
- Aar Maanta, Somali-British singer-songwriter, actor, composer, instrumentalist and music producer
  Amina Mohamed, Dhulbahante, former chairman of the International Organization for Migration and the World Trade Organisation's General Council
- Yusuf Mohamed Ismail, Majeerteen, former ambassador of Somalia to the United Nations Human Rights Office in Geneva

=== Writers and musicians ===
- Aadan Carab, Dhulbahante, poet who narrated the Dhulbahante genocide at the hands of European colonialists in the Darawiish era
- Abdulkadir Hersi Siyad Yamyam, Marehan, was a Somali poet and playwright.
- Ahmed Farah Ali Idaaja, Marehan, one of the first Somali language writers and "father" of the Somali written folklore
- Nuruddin Farah, Ogaden, World-famous Somali novelist
- Ahmed Rasta, Marehan, singer. nicknamed Boqorka Codka (King of Voice.)
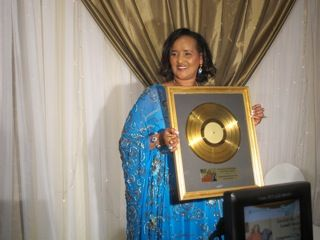
- Saado Ali Warsame, singer-songwriter and former MP in the Federal Parliament of Somalia
  Aar Maanta, Ogaden, Somali-British singer-songwriter, actor, composer, instrumentalist and music producer.
- Ahmed Biif, Dishiishe, former singer whom turned into a preacher
- Mohamed Nuur Giriig, Warsangeli, Classical Singer. (1935–2002)
- Saado Ali Warsame, Dhulbahante, singer-songwriter and former MP in the Federal Parliament of Somalia
- Faarax Maxamed Jaamac Cawl, Warsangeli, writer
- Careys Ciise Kaarshe, Awrtable, poet.

=== Military leaders and personnel ===
- Faarax Qarshe, Darawiish governor of Bah Udgoon
- General Sulub Ahmed Firin, Abaskuul Jidwaaq Absame, Somalia Chief Police Commander
- Adan Ali Gurey, Dhulbahante, commander of Golaweyne
- Suleiman Aden Galaydh, Dhulbahante Darawiish commander at Cagaarweyne
- Haji Yusuf Barre, Dhulbahante, commander of the biggest battle in Darawiish history, i.e. Jidbali; made the last stand at Taleh
- Yusuf Agararan, Dhulbahante, led most successful Darawiish raid since Dul Madoba
- Ibraahin Xoorane, Dhulbahante, Darawiish commander who killed Richard Corfield
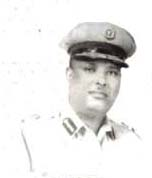
  Jama Ali Korshel, Somali Army General, former Head of Somali Police and one of the leaders of 1969 coup d'état of Somalia
- Axmed Aarey, Dhulbahante, Darawiish artillery commander who abetted Richard Corfield's death
- Afqarshe Ismail, Dhulbahante, former Darawiish spokesman-poet; first person to die in an airstrike in Africa
- Nur Hedik, Dhulbahante, commander of the Dooxato (Darawiish cavalry) who had a Shiikhyaale regiment named after him
- Abdulkadir Sheikh Dini, Marehan, former minister of defence of Somalia
- Abdullahi Anod, Marehan, former head commander of Somali Military Forces
- Mohammed Said Hersi Morgan, Majeerteen, Defense Minister Under The Siad Barre Government
- Yusuf Osman Dhumal, Marehan, former head commander of Somali Military Forces
- Abdirizak Haji Hussein, Majeerteen, former prime minister of Somalia, and former secretary general of the Somali Youth League.
- Barre Adan Shire Hiiraale, Marehan, former minister of defence of Somalia, Head Jubba Valley Alliance
- Jama Ali Korshel, Warsangeli, Somali Army general, former head of Somali Police and one of the leaders of 1969 coup d'état of Somalia
- Ahmed Warsame, Marehan, head of the Somali Military Academy.
- Abdullahi Ahmed Jama, Warsangeli, former Minister of Jusqqtice and 1977 Ogaden War Veteran
- Mohamed Abshir Muse, Majerteen, first commander of the Somali Police Force
- Bashir Abdi Mohammed "Ameeriko", Majerteen, current Somali federal government police force commander
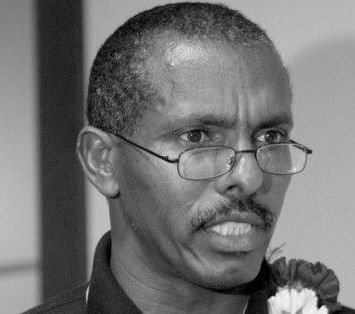
- Abdi Bile, first Somali world champion in the 1500 metres
  General Mohamed Hussien Daa'ud "Xiirane", Awrtable, a High Commanding General in the Ogaden War

=== Politicians ===
- Mohamed Abdullahi Mohamed (Farmajo), Marehan, former president of Somalia
- Abdullahi Yusuf Ahmed, Majeerteen, former president of Somalia, first president and founding father of Puntland
- Abdirahman Omar Mohamed (Dr. Cunaaye), Awrtable, was the former director of Benaadir Regional Medical, Public Health, and Epidemiology Services
- Abdi Farah Shirdon, Marehan, former prime minister of Somalia
- Hirsi Bulhan Farah Majeerteen, former minister in the civilian government of the 1960s, political prisoner and Pan-Somalist.
- Aden Ibrahim Aw Hirsi, Marehan, Author, Politician – Former minister of planning of Jubaland state of Somalia.
- Abdirashid Shermarke, Majeerteen, second president of Somalia, 1967–1969
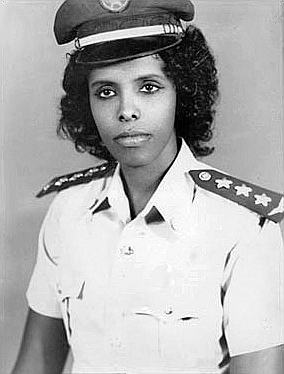
- Asli Hassan Abade, first and only female Somali pilot
  Mohamed Aden Sheikh, Marean premier Somali intellectual and former head of Somali Technological Development, Minister of Information, Minister of Education, Head of the Ideology Bureau SRRC
- Omar Haji Massale, Marehan, former minister of defence of Somalia
- Abdiweli Gaas, Majeerteen current president of Puntland
- Abdi Shire Warsame, Marehan, former Somali ambassador to Kenya and China and former Foreign Affairs State minister in Transitional National Government
- Ahmed Mohamed Islam(Axmed Madoobe), Ogaden, President of Jubbaland State of Somalia
- Abdiwahid Gonjeh, Marehan, former prime minister of Somalia, member of upper house
- Ahmed Elmi Osman (Karaash), Dhulbahante, Minister of Interior of Puntland and former president of Khatumo State
- Fatimo Isaak Bihi, Marehan, first Somali female ambassador, Ambassador to Geneva, Director of the African Department of the Ministry of Foreign Affairs
- Abdiasis Nur Hersi, Awrtable, the former Minister of Labor and Sports from 1970 to 1977
- Abdi Mohamoud Omar, Ogaden, president of Somali region of Ethiopia
- Mohamed Abdi Yusuf, Awrtable, former prime minister of Somalia
- Abdulahi Sheik Ismael Fara-Tag, member of sen of upper house
- Abdihakim Abdullahi Haji Omar, Dhulbahante, Vice President of Puntland
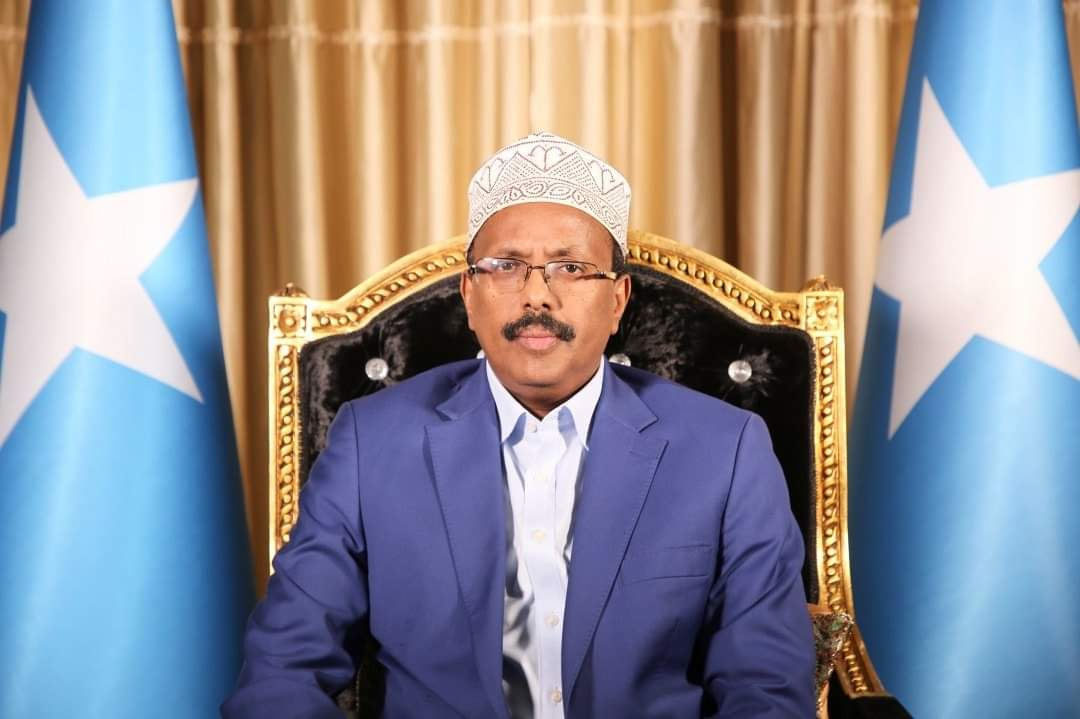
- Mohamed Abdullahi Mohamed, president of Somalia
  Ahmed Mohamed Hassan, Marehan, Member of the Pan-African Parliament from Djibouti
- Abdirahman Farole, Majeerteen, former president of Puntland
- Abdirizak Haji Hussein, Majeerteen, former prime minister of Somalia, and former secretary general of the Somali Youth League.
- Abdirizak Jurile, Dishiishe, veteran politician, diplomat and professor. Former TFG minister of planning & International Cooperation, Former MP, former executive director of numerous UN and International organisations, Senator
- Abdiweli Sheikh Ahmed, Marehan, former prime minister of Somalia
- Omar Sharmarke, Majeerteen, Prime Minister of Somalia, and son of Abdirashid Ali Shermarke
- Abdulkadir Abdi Hashi, Leelkase, State Minister of the Presidency for Planning and International Relations of Puntland
- Farah Ali Jama, Majeerteen, former Minister of Finance of Puntland
- Abdulahi Bille Nour, Dishiishe, Somali State Minister of Education, Cultural & Higher Education, One of Somali longest serving national MPs.
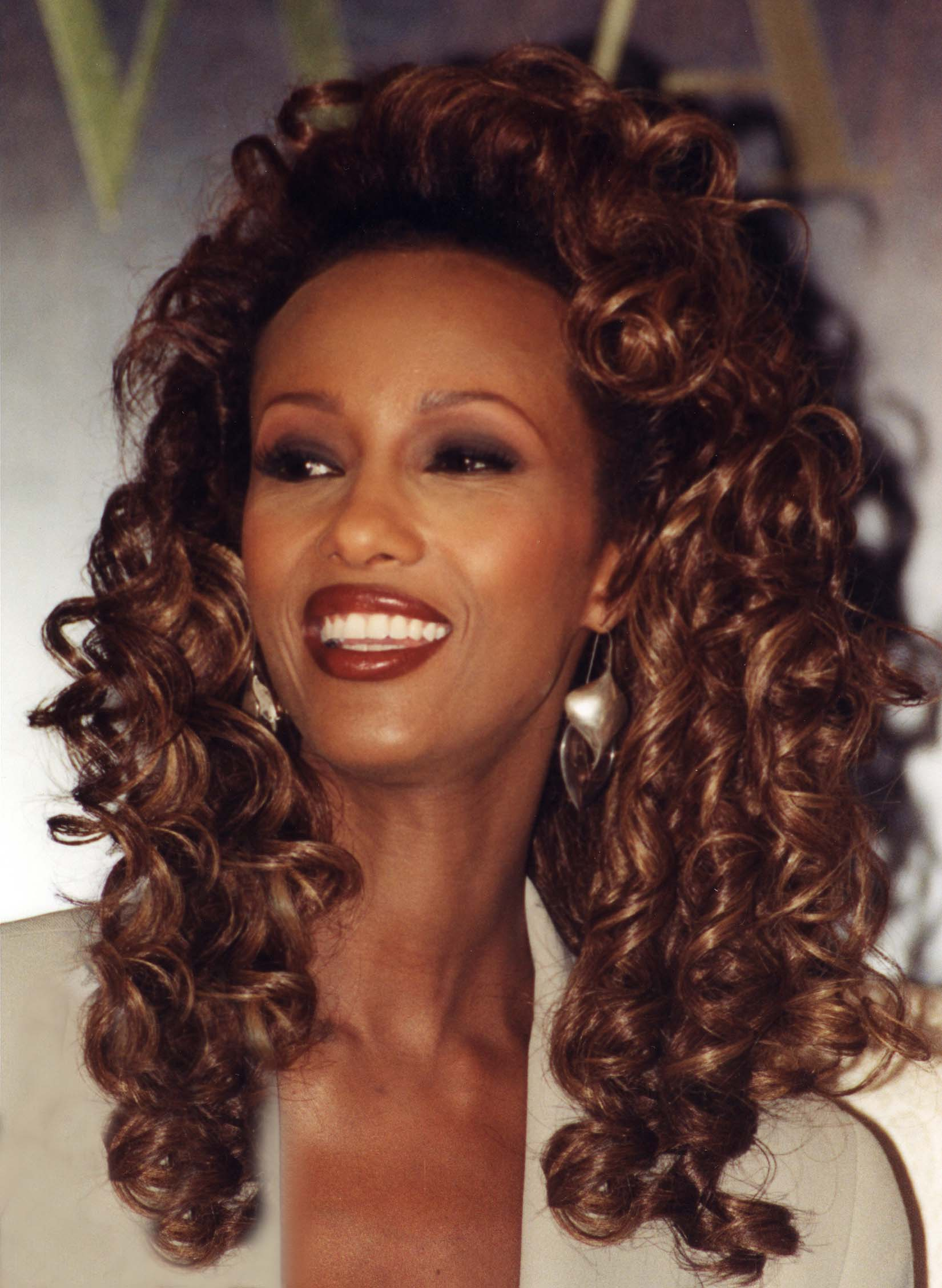
- Iman, Somali supermodel, actress and entrepreneur
  Abdulrahman Jama Barre, Marehan, former foreign minister of Somalia and close relative of Siad Barre
- Shukran Hussein Gure, Ogaden, MP for Garissa County
- Jabir Mohamed Abdi is the current State Minister of Education of the Federal Government of Somalia
- Said Mohamed Rage, Dishiishe, Founder of Puntland Counter-piracy Agency and Puntland Minister of Ports, Marine Transportation and Marine Resource
- Farah Maalim, Ogaden, Deputy Speaker in the Parliament of Kenya
- Cabbaas Xuseen, Dhulbahante, first prime minister of the Darawiish (1895–1900)
- Xaashi Suni Fooyaan, Dhulbahante, peace-time prime minister of the Darawiish (1905–1906)

=== Engineers ===
- Asli Hassan Abade, Ogaden, First Ever African Female Military Pilot
- Ali Matan Hashi, Marehan, first Somali pilot, commander of Somali Airforce 1959–1978, Minister of Justice, Minister of Health, Somali Nationalist.
- Ali Meggar, Darawiish naval commander

=== Athletes ===
- Abdi Bile, Dhulbahante, former middle-distance runner and 1500m world champion in 1987.

=== Other ===
- Iman (model), Majeerteen, a supermodel, actress and entrepreneur
- Fatima Jibrell, Dhulbahante, Somali-American environmentalist
- Hirsi Magan Isse, Majeerteen, scholar and one of the leaders of the Somali revolution
- Nathif Jama Adam, Ogaden, Governor of Garissa County and former Head of the Sharjah Islamic Bank's Investments & International Banking Division
- Abdirahman Nur Hersi, Awrtable, The former Minister of Finance in Somalia and founding member and executive Vice President of the Islamic Development Bank
