= Abaskuul =

Somali clan in Ethiopia

The Abaskuul, Abasguul, Abasgul or Abaskul (Somali: Abasguul, Abaskuul. Arabic: ابسغول) is a Somali sub-clan of the Habar Maqdi Jidwaaq, Absame, Darod line. The Abaskuul mainly reside between Jigjiga and Degahbur in the Somali Region in Ethiopia, but also have settlements in Jubaland (Somalia) and Kenya. They share borders with the Ogaden, Bartire, and Habar Awal clans. The Abaskuul were famously described in Richard Burton's First Footsteps in East Africa, as well as 17 Trips to Somaliland and a Visit to Abyssinia by Captain Harald G. C. Swayne. The Jidwaaq clan, and especially the Bartire and Yabarre sub-clans, were explicitly in Futuh al-Habasha.

== Distribution ==
The Abaskuul clan makes up a significant portion of the Fafan and Middle-Juba valleys in Ethiopia's Somali Region and Somalia, respectively. Fafan is also generally regarded as the most densely populated region in the Somali Region, given that a large majority of the inhabitants are agro-pastoralists. In addition to Jigjiga, the Abaskuul make the majority of inhabitants of the neighboring districts such as Mulla, Kebribeyah, and Araarso. In Somalia, the clan is mostly centered around Bu'aale and Naasiriya districts in Middle Juba, along with Bartire, whom they make up Jidwaaq together.

There are also pockets of long-term Abaskuul settlements in Somaliland, particularly the Isse-subclan, in parts of Sool. They have a representation in Somaliland. Skirmishes between the Abaskuul and the Fiqishinni in Adhicadeeye ended with government settlement.

== Clan tree ==
The clan tree of Abaskuul delineates as follows:

- Absame
  - Ogaden
  - Bal’ad
  - Weytein (Habar Maqdi)
  - Jidwaaq (Habar Maqdi)
    - Barre Jidwaaq (Bartire)
    - Rooble Jidwaaq (Abaskuul)
    - Shahrudin Jidwaaq (Yabaree)

== Notable figures ==
The Abaskuul clan have produced many notable figures, including:

- Hawo Osman (Taako), Somali Republic martyr and struggle figure
