= Maqdi =

Somali clan

هبرمقدي
- Flag of the Adal Sultanate

Languages
- Somali & Arabic

Religion
- Islam

The Habr Maqdi (Arabic: هبرمقدي) was a historical Somali confederation that composed of multiple clans such as the Bartire and Yabarre who are considered now a part of the Jidwaaq and come under the Absame Darod branch. The Habr Maqdi are well known for their conquests in Abyssinia as they had played a very prominent role in Ethiopian-Adal War. They are famous for bringing the largest army and were very loyal to Imam Ahmed. Richard Burton documented the Bartire branch of Habr Maqdi to have long been connected with the emirs of Harar. Both sub-clans of Habr Maqdi are mentioned explicitly in Futuh al-Habasha.

== Origin ==
The Habr Maqdi is a historical Somali clan, The prominent subclans of Habar Maqdi are Bartire and Yabarray subclans who both fought during the Adal-Abyssinian War. They primarily inhabit the Somali Region of Ethiopia, (where they live in the Jigjiga area), North Eastern Province of Kenya and the Jubaland region of southern Somalia (where they live south of Bu'ale).They are mostly agro-pastoralists. They often engage in agriculture but also raise livestock

== Descriptions about Habr Maqdi ==
The Habr Maqdi clan have historically lived in Harar and its surrounding areas, its well documented that the Bertarri sub clan of Habar Maqdi had control of trade and the caravan route up to Berbera this was documented by British explorer Richard Burton.

Richard Burton writes

The Berteri, who occupy the Gurays Range, south of, and limitrophe to, the Gallas, and thence extend eastward to the Jigjiga hills, are estimated at 3000 shields. Whilst other animals have indigenous names, the horse throughout the) Of Darud origin, they own allegiance to the Gerad Hirsi, and were, when I visited the country, on bad terms with the Girhi. The chiefs family has, for several generations, been connected with the Amir's of Harar, and the caravan's route to and from Berberah lying through his country, makes

The Habr Maqdi tribe were the first clan to have arrived at the jihad meeting the Imam at Harar. the imam was extremely elated at the Habar Maqdi. they also brought the biggest army numbering 2000 soldiers when they had reached Harar. The writer and historian Arab faqih described the Habar Maqdi leader commenting 'wearing particularly exquisite clothing'. the imam welcomed the Habar Maqdi with plenty of gifts and provisions.

In Futuh al Habesh, the Habr Maqdi were described as skilled highway robbers who would commit banditry to the country, this is explained by their strategic control of the route to Berbera and the caravans later to be documented by Richard Burton

During the Conquest of Abyssinia they were moments when the sub-clans of Habar Maqdi will often split into two military divisions, Ahmed girri bin Hussein was the chieftain of Yabarre sub clan while Berterri sub clan were led by a Malasai called Garad Dhaweyd. The Yibberay clan mentioned in Futuh al Habesh are confirmed to be Yabarray by French researchers in 1961. Its also important to note that the first ever translation of Futuh Al Habesh was in French.

Cahiers d'études africaines confirms Yiberri being Yabarray

La valeur guerrière est restée jusqu'à nos jours une des qualités maîtresses des Somalis; d'autre part on sait que les Somalis, et spécia-lement les Somalis Darod, étaient en pleine expansion vers l'ouest et les Geri, les Marrehân, les Harti qui sont cités ailleurs, et les Yabarray qui s'identifient sans doute avec les Yiberri du Futuh el Habasa ,sont précisément des Darod.L'alliance entre les Musulmans du « Royaume d'Adal » et les Somalis aurait ainsi permis aux premiers d'utiliser la force d'expansion des envahisseurs Darod, pour leur entreprise de conquête de l'Abyssinie. Aux Somalis, il faut ajouter les Harlah qui, sous le nom de Harla

English Translation

Warrior valor has remained one of the main qualities of the Somalis to this day; on the other hand, we know that the Somalis, and especially the Darod Somalis, were in full expansion towards the west and the Geri, the Marrehân, the Harti who are cited elsewhere, and the Yabarray who no doubt identify with the Yiberri of Futuh el Habasa are precisely Darod. expansion of the Darod invaders, for their enterprise of conquest of Abyssinia. To the Somalis must be added the Harla who, under the name of Harla,

== The Conquest Of Abyssinia ==
The Habar Maqdi clan trace their origins to the Adal Sultanate 500 years ago, it's written that the Habr Maqdi clan were highway robbers who used to commit banditry and used to act evilly to the country. Arab Faqih documents that the Habr Maqdi clan to have robbed the Geri clan who were very loyal to the Imam and were on route to the jihad.

Arab Faqih Notes

Among the Somali tribes there was another called Habr Maqdi from which the imam had demanded the alms tax. They refused to pay it, resorting to banditry on the roads, and acting evilly towards the country

The Geri clan complained to the imam telling him ' they would never robbed us if we were not on route to the jihad' this then angered the imam which caused a war between the Geri clan and Habar Maqdi clan. Subsequently, the Imam conquered and plundered the lands of Habar Maqdi forcing them to submit to the imam. Arab Faqih notes

The tribe of Girri complained to the imam, telling him, They would never have attacked our country if we had not entered your service, and made peace with you. This distressed Imam Ahmad who organized his forces and went to the country of the Somalis, to the Habr Maqdi who were engaging in brigandage and plundering the possessions of the Muslims, time after time.

== Call to Jihad ==
After the imam had plundered the Habr Maqdi a second time, the imam began sending letters to various Somali tribes in the vicinity. the tribes he sent are mentioned clearly the first Somali tribes he sent letters to were Habr Maqdi sub-clans like Yabarre and Bartire and Geri Koombe, Marehan.

Arab faqih notes

The imam sent Ali to one of the Somali tribes called Yibberi, He also sent a messenger to the tribe of Girri which was the tribe whose leader and chieftain was Matan bin Uthman bin Khaled the Somali, his brother-in-law who was one of the heroic and gracious knights who died as a martyr He sent another messenger to the tribe of Marraihan whose chieftain was Hirabu bin Adam, and he also sent [messengers) to the outlying Provinces to spur them on to the jihad, for God, and in the way of the Most High God.

After the imam sent the messengers to the various Somali tribes the Somalis accepted the jihad without a doubt, Arab Faqih notes the Somalis came in great numbers. the imam had then directed the Somalis to come to Harar, the first tribe to arrive at Harar was the Habr Maqdi tribe with their leader Ahmed Girri Bin Hussein. Arab Faqih notes that

The first of the tribes to reach the imam was Habr Maqdi with their chieftain Ahmad Girri bin Husain, the Somali. They encamped in a place called Qasa in the heights above the valley of Harar. They showed off their equipment and their weapons and paraded their horses. They were knights, and what knights! And they were foot soldiers; and what foot soldiers! The imam rejoiced at their arrival exceedingly. They met the imam face to face, and he welcomed them with the warmest of welcomes. He gave them gifts of apparel, and provisions, and treated them graciously, garbing their chieftain, Ahmad Girri, in particularly exquisite clothing

When the Muslims arrived at Biqulzar before the battle of Badeqe the imam began preparing and assembling his forces, Arab faqih a documents the numbers of the Habr Maqdi clan its documented that they brought 2000 soldiers to the Battle of Badeqe under the leadership of Ahmed Girri bin Hussein Al Somali thus confirming the Habr Maqdi clan to have brought the most troops Arab Faqih notes

At that time the imam assembled his forces and called up his army. He tied a white standard to a spear, and entrusted it to the wazir Adli and the people of Sim rallied to him, from the tribe of the Somalis the Habr Maqdi and the tribe of Ahmad Girri, and with them two-hundred cavalry and two-thousand infantry like savage lions.

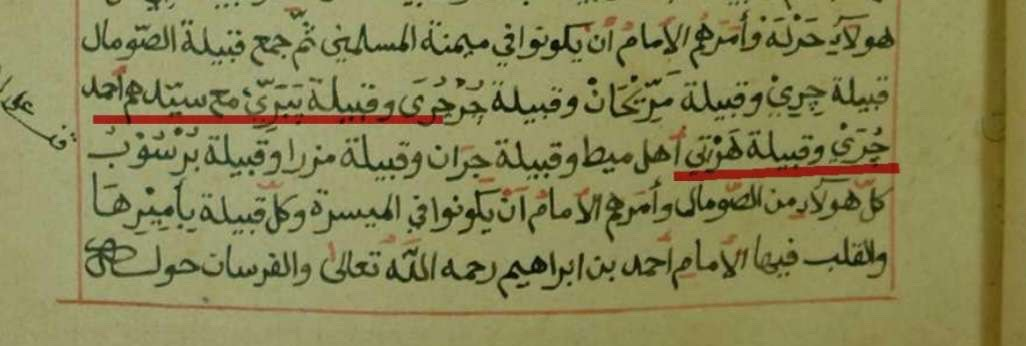
16th century manuscript showing Ahmed Girri Bin Hussein leading Yabarray division of Habar Maqdi The text underlined in red translates to '' The tribe of Yabirray with their leader Ahmed Girri ''

The Habr Maqdi tribe when engaging in battle was normally split into two sub clans one being the Yabarray division under Ahmed Girri Bin Hussein and the Berteri division. Garad Dhaweyd was the leader of the Berteri division of Habar Maqdi, but sometimes would lead the entirety of Habr Maqdi on the left, a 16th-century manuscript written by Sihab al din faqih, who is a Yemeni writer and historian documenting Ahmed Girri bin Hussein leading the Yabarray sub-clan of Habar Maqdi, Garad Dhaweyd leading Bartire division

Garad Dhaweyd was mentioned among the honorable knights fighting with the Imam and was also Malassay, an elite unit that fought with the Imam.

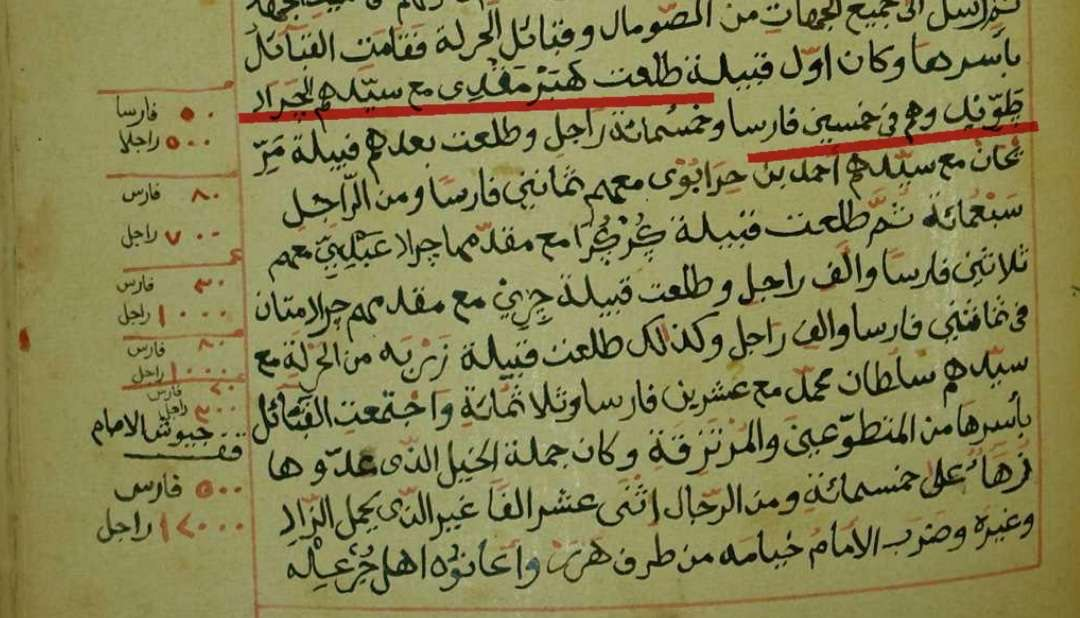
Garad Dhaweyd leading Habr Maqdi

Ten knights renowned for their courage, Del Sagad, Takla, Ura'i Nür bin Där 'Ali, Abjad bin Abun, Garad Dawit al-Bartirri, Jinah Satut from the people of Sim, Yusef, Saidi Muhammad bin 'Ali al-Bagari whose father was an Arab - he had been the treasurer for the Imam, and was lord of Dawaro - and Abu Bakr bin Yamag Ahmad

== Relations with Harar ==
In May 1854, Richard Burton travelled to Aden in preparation for his Somali Expedition, supported by the Royal Geographical Society. Other members included G.E. Herne, William Stroyan, and John Hanning Speke. Burton then undertook the expedition to Harar, where he came across many Somali clans inhabiting the area. During his time at Harar, Burton met with Gerad Hirsi (Garad of Berteri) and he documented the Habr Maqdi sub-clans like Berteri and Yabarray having connections with emirs of Harar. Burton also documented how the Habr Maqdi sub-clans like Berteri have intermarried with the emirs of Harar for generations.

Burton writes

The Berteri, who occupy the Gurays Range, south of, and limitrophe to, the Gallas, and thence extend eastward to the Jigjiga hills, are estimated at 3000 shields. Whilst other animals have indigenous names, the horse throughout the) of Darud origin, they own allegiance to the Garad Hirsi, and were, when I visited the country, on bad terms with the Girhi. The chiefs family has, for several generations, been connected with the Amirs of Harar, and the caravan's route to and from Berberah lying through his country, makes

== See also ==
- Ahmad ibn Ibrahim al-Ghazi
- Adal Sultanate
- Jidwaq
- Ahmed Girri Bin Hussein Al Somali
- Matan ibn Uthman Al Somali
- Garad Hirabu Goita Tedros Al Somali
