= Hinda =

Hinda may refer to:

- Hinda (beetle), a genus of ladybird beetles
- Hinda Hicks, Tunisian-born British singer
- Hinda Abdi Mohamoud, Somali journalist
- Hinda Miller (born 1950), member of the Vermont State Senate
- Hinda Wassau (1906-1980), striptease and burlesque star
- a variant spelling of Hind bint Utbah, 6th-7th-century Arab woman associated with Muhammed
- Hinda, Republic of the Congo, a small town

== See also ==
- Hindås, a locality in Sweden
