= Jidwaq (clan) =

Somali clan

Jidwaaq جيدواق
Regions with significant populations
- Somali Region

Languages
- Somali

Religion
- Islam (Predominantly Sunni, Sufism)

Related ethnic groups
- Darod, Absame, Ogaden, Abaskuul, Bartire and other Somali clans

The Jidwaq (Somali: Jidwaaq, Arabic: جيدواق) is a major subclan, part of one of the largest Somali clans families, the Absame Darod. Jidwaq are well known for their conquests in Abyssinia during the 1500s they played a very prominent role in the Adal Sultanate. They are famous for bringing the largest army and were very loyal to Imam Ahmad. Jidwaq have produced notable generals such as Ahmed Girri Bin Hussein who was the right hand man of Ahmad ibn Ibrahim al-Ghazi.

== Overview ==
The Jidwaq clan primarily inhabit the Somali Region of Ethiopia, (where they live in the Jigjiga area), the North Eastern Province of Kenya and the Jubaland region of southern Somalia (where they live south of Bu'ale). The name Jidwaaq means "the path of God" in the Somali language. The Jidwaq clan are now mainly divided into three branches; Rooble Jidwaaq (Abaskuul), Shahrudin Jidwaaq (Yabaree) and Barre Jidwaaq (Bartire).

According to the UNHCR, the Jidwaq in the Somali Region are mostly agro-pastoralists. They often engage in agriculture but also raise livestock.

== History ==
The Jidwaq clan primarily inhabit Fafan Zone in the Somali Region of Ethiopia as well as Jubaland, a Federal Member State in southern Somalia. They were among the first tribes to accept the call of jihad during the conquest of Abyssinia. They have produced notable military commanders such as Ahmed Girri Bin Hussein who was the right hand of the Imam, a knight serving under Adal Sultanate who then later progressed to becoming a military commander leading the Somali units in battle.

Arab Faqih notes

Then he assembled the Somali clans the tribe of Girri, the tribe of Marraihan, the tribe of Yibberi with their chieftain Ahmad Girri, the clan of the Härti, people of Mait, the tribe of Jairan, the tribe of Mazzar. the tribe of Barsub all of these were Somalis and they were ordered by the Imam to hold the left they were all under Matan

The Jidwaaq have been described in The Journal of the Royal Geographical Society as the western-most branches of the Darod clan. The Bartire subclan in particular has been described as pastoralists in addition to growing coffee, as well as intermarrying with the Emirs of Harar, giving them an amount of influence.

To the South and S.S.W. of Berbera, on the road to Hurrur, the kafilas pass though [sic] the country of the Burtirrh, and Girrhi, the two most western branches of the family of Darood. Of these two tribes little is known. The Emirs of Hurrur have for many years intermarried with the Burtirrhi, and this gives them a certain degree of influence, but they do not visit the sea-coast so commonly as the other tribes, and appear to be a pastoral race, occupied solely in tending their flocks and herds, and in planting the coffee-tree on the low ranges S.E. of Hurrur.

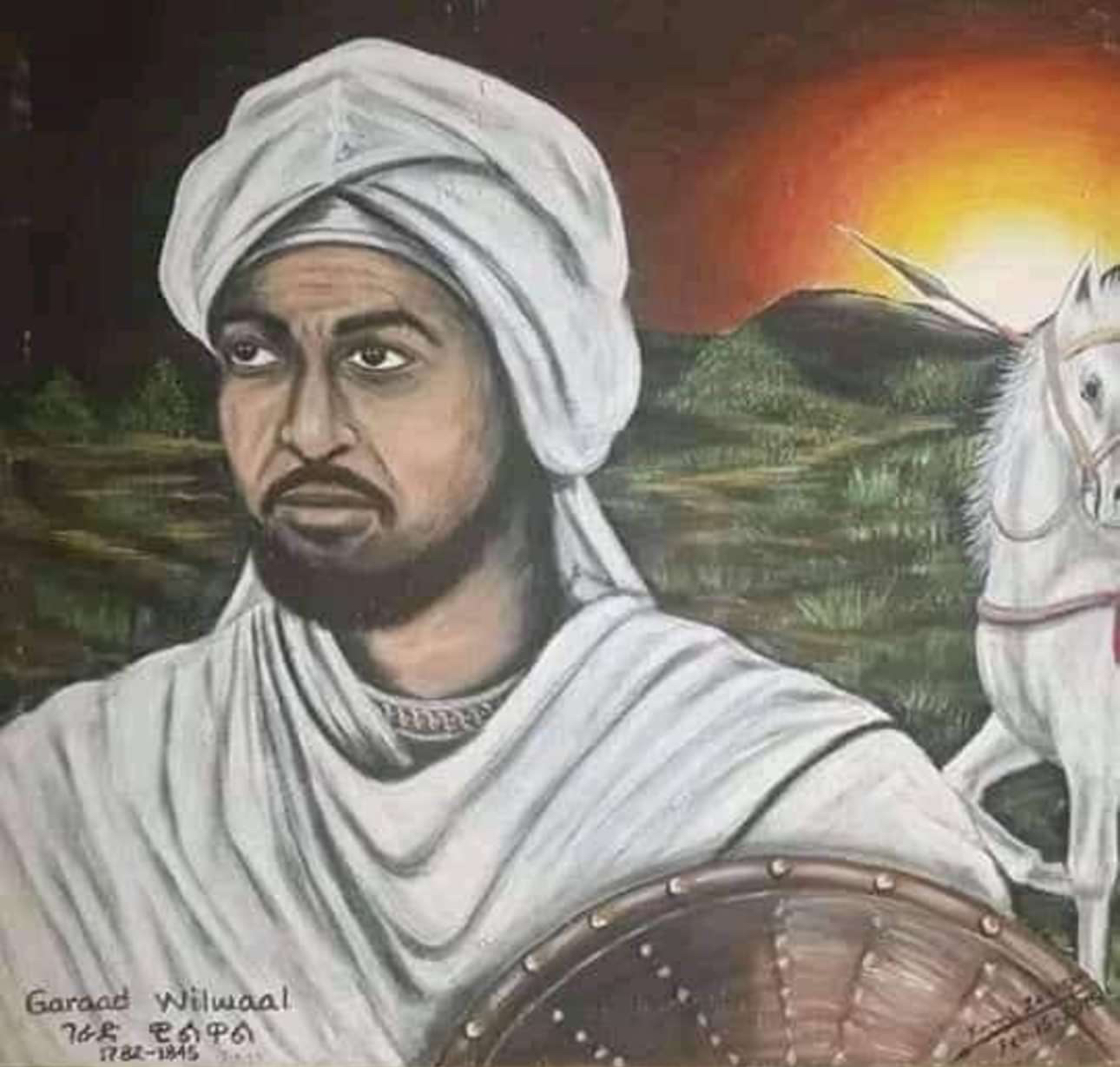
Wiil Waal ~ (1793-1856)

Garad Hirsi Farah Hirsi, better known as Wiil Waal (Somali: Garaad Xirsi Faraax Xirsi Wiil-Waal, Amharic: ገራድ ዊልዋል) Garad Wiil Waal was a traditional Somali king who lived during the 19th century in Jigjiga. He hailed from the Bartire Jidwaaq sub-clan of the major Darod tribe. Historical records depict Garad Hirsi Farah Hirsi as a man of strong judgment and wisdom, though he was also known for being cruel and unforgiving, earning him the nickname "Wiil-Waal," which translates to "Crazy Boy" in Somali. Different accounts of Garad Hirsi exist: some portray him as cruel, violent, and avaricious, while others describe him as a godly, prayerful individual. Despite these differing views, all agree that he led a tumultuous life.

About the Gerad Hirsi different reports were rife: some described him as cruel, violent, and avaricious; others spoke of him as a godly (man) and a prayerful person: all, however, agreed that he had sown wild oats. In token of re-pentance, he was fond of feeding Widads, and the Shaykh Jami of Harar was a frequent guest at his kraal.

He spent much of his life engaged in raids and defending his people, notably liberating the Somalis from the Galla Oromos in what is now Jigjiga and its surrounding areas. The story of Garad Wiil Waal now has been adapted into a bilingual (English and Somali) children's picture book under the "Somali Bilingual Book Project" Wiil Waal: Written by Kathleen Moriarty, with illustrations by Amin Amir and translation by Jamal Adam. the book aims to teach Somali culture, wisdom, and the importance of clever thinking.

Hawo Tako, also known as (Xaawo Taako or Hawa Osman) was a revolutionary freedom fighter, born in Kebri Beyah in the Somali Region, Ethiopia. Her brother was one of the founding fathers of SYL, in which his disappearance brought her to become a member. Hawo Tako participated in the 1948 riots of Mogadishu where she was killed.

== Clan tree ==
There is no clear agreement on the clan and sub-clan structures and many lineages are omitted. The following listing is taken from the World Bank's Conflict in Somalia: Drivers and Dynamics from 2005 and the United Kingdom's Home Office publication, Somalia Assessment 2001.

- Darod (Daarood bin Isma'il al-Jabarti)
  - Kablalah
    - Kumade
      - Absame
        - Ogaden
        - Bal'ad
        - Weytein
        - Jidwaaq
          - Barre Jidwaaq (Bartire)
          - Rooble Jidwaaq (Abaskuul)
          - Shahrudin Jidwaaq (Yabaree)

== Notable persons ==
- Hawo Tako, Abaskuul, Somali nationalist hero
- Garad Hirsi Farah Hirsi (Wiil-Waal), Bartire, The 17th Garad of the Absame. The Jigjiga Airport (JIJ) is named after him. Many Somali folklore stories are based on his life.
- Ahmed Girri Bin Hussein Al Somali, Yabarre, 16th century Adalite Leader
- Sheikh Hassan Yabarre, Sultan of the Yabarre clan. Sheik Hassen Yabare Referral Hospital (JIJ) is named after him.
- Hasan Muhumed (Xasan Daadhi), Bartire, Current Minister of Water Resources for the Somali Region.
- Abdiwasa Abdilahi Bade, Abaskuul, Somali academic and Ethiopian Federal Government Minister.
- Abdulfatah Abdullahi Hassan, Abaskuul, Former Ethiopian Federal Minister for Labour, Current Ambassador to Somalia
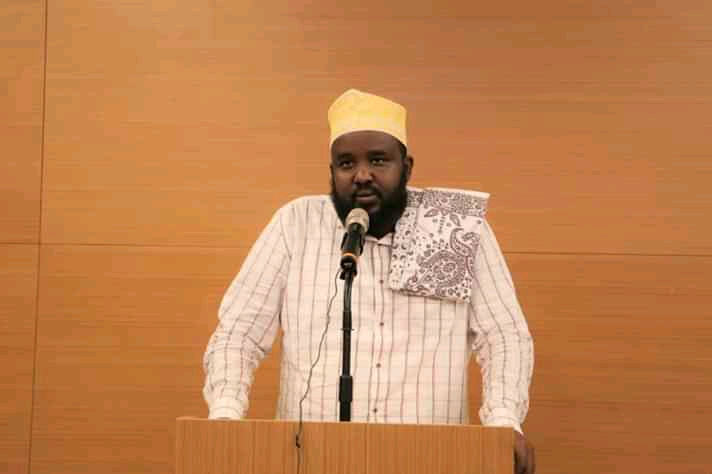
  Garad Kulmiye Garad Mohammed Garad Dool
- Garad Kulmiye Mohammed Dool Wiil-Waal, The current Garad of the Absame, Bartire, and leader of the Somali Region Council of Elders.
- Mubashir Dubbad Raage, Abaskuul, Former Minister of Finance, Current Minister for Security of the Somali Region.

== See also ==
- Habr Maqdi
- Ahmed Girri Bin Hussein Al Somali
- Darod
