= Araarso =

- Town
- Country: Ethiopia

Araarso is a town of Somali Region in Ethiopia.

It is about 70 kilometers southeast of Jijiga, the capital of Somali Region.
