= Ahmed Girri Bin Hussein Al Somali =

Somali military commander

Commander of the Somali Adalite Division Ahmed Girri Bin Hussein Al-Somali أحمد جرئ بن حسين الصومالي
- Native name: Ahmed Girri Bin Hussein
- Born: 16th century
- Allegiance: Adal Sultanate
- Branch: Commander
- Rank: Division Commander
- Conflicts: Battle of Shimbra Kure; Battle of Amba Sel; Battle of Badeqe

Ahmed Girri Bin Hussein (Somali: Axmed Girri Bin Xussein, Arabic: أحمد جرئ بن حسين) was a Somali military commander and general that served the Adal Sultanate. He played a key prominent role in the campaigns of Ahmad ibn Ibrahim al-Ghazi by bringing one of the largest armies to aid the Imam in Jihad. Ahmed Girri hailed from the Yabarray clan. He was also the chieftain of Habr Maqdi which was a collective of Yabarray and Bartire. He was regarded one of the most capable generals during the Conquest of Abyssinia alongside Garad Matan.

== Early life ==
Born into the prominent Jidwaaq clan, he played a key role in the Muslim conquests of the Horn of Africa by bringing one of the largest armies to Adal. and was mentioned among the honorable knights of the Imam. Ahmed Girri Bin Hussein was the commander of Adal empire .

Robert Ferry also confirms

“Warrior valor has remained one of the main qualities of the Somalis to this day; on the other hand, we know that the Somalis, and especially the Darod Somalis, were in full expansion towards the west and the Geri, the Marrehân, the Harti who are cited elsewhere, and the Yabarray who undoubtly identify with the Yiberri of Futuh el Habasa are precisely Darod. expansion of the Darod invaders, for their enterprise of conquest of Abyssinia. To the Somalis must be added the Harla who, under the name of Harla now consider themselves a fraction of Issa but are distinguished from the Somalis.”

The famous Futuh Al-Habasha manuscript was written during the 16th century by Shihāb al-Dīn Aḥmad ibn ʻAbd al-Qādir ʻArabfaqīh, who was present during the rise and fall of the Adal Sultanate as well as the actual jihad. Shihāb al-Dīn would later document about the Ethiopian-Adal War and explicitly about the Somali clans that participated. Arab Faqih notes

“..then he assembled the Somali clans, the tribe of Girri, the tribe of Marraihan, the tribe of Yibberi with their chieftain Ahmad Girri, the tribe of Harti from the people of Mait, the tribe of Jairan, the tribe of Mazzar, the tribe of Barsub all of these were Somalis and they were ordered by the imam to hold the left flank, they were all under Matan.”

== Military history ==
It is noted that Ahmad Girri Bin Hussein was one of the most capable Adalite generals alongside Garad Matan. He was the chieftain of the Yabarray clan but also led the Habar Maqdi which was a confederacy between Bartirre and Yabarray. Both are part of the Jidwaaq clan today which are part of the larger Darod clan. But most times he led Yabarray and Bartirre under Habar Maqdi.

Arab Faqih confirms that Habar Maqdi is Bartirre;

“Then he split his force into three divisions. The first consisted of the people of Sim, the tribe of Marraihan and Bar Tarri which are the Habr Maqdi and the people of Jawatir: they were under the command of the wazir 'Addol.”

French contemporary writer, Amelia Checkroun writes that the Habar Maqdi clan under Ahmed Girri were among the top five Somalis mentioned to have played an important role, the Habar Maqdi were instrumental to the conquest of Abyssinia. Amelia Checkroun further confirms that the Habar Maqdi were a composition of Yabaray and Bartire both of these clans today are identified to be a part of Jidwaaq which is part of the wider Amelia Checkroun writes;

“Five of the Somali clans appear several times and allows for a better understanding of them. These are the clans of Yabari and Harti, but especially the clans of Girri, Marayahan and Habr Maqdi. These five clans, more particularly the last three, we learned several things about the Somali. First, each clan was independent of the other. Some clans are subdivided into “sub-clans”, like the Bartirri which united the Habr Maqdi and the Gawätir. There does not seem to be any Somali authority bringing together all the clans under one command. So when a conflict breaks out between two clans, they turn to the authority of the imam.”

== Relationship with the Imam ==
The Imam first conquered the Habar Maqdi for engaging in banditry subsequently making them submit, afterwards the Habar Maqdi made peace with him. Before the Conquest of Abyssinia, the Imam began sending messengers to every tribe in the vicinity of Harar and its surrounding areas. He dispatched a messenger named Ali to the Yabaray and two other messengers to the Geri clan and Marehan.

After the Yabaray accepted the imams call to jihad, Ahmed Girri recruited members from his tribe and united them. The first tribe to arrive in Harar was the Habar Maqdi with their leader Ahmed Girri, who brought one of the largest armies numbering 2000 soldiers, consisting of a confederacy of Yabarray and Bartirre.

Arab Faqih details:

“The first of the tribes to arrive to the imam was Habr Maqdi with their leader and chieftain Ahmad Girri bin Husain, the Somali. They encamped in a place called Qasa in the heights above the valley of Harar. They showed off their equipment and their weapons, and paraded their horses. They were knights, and what knights! And they were great foot-soldiers; and what foot soldiers! The imam rejoiced at their arrival exceedingly. They met the imam face to face, and he welcomed them with the warmest of welcomes. He gave them gifts of apparel, and provisions, and treated them graciously, garbing their chieftain Ahmad Girri in particularly exquisite clothing.”

He also notes how the imam was extremely elated at the fact that the Habar Maqdi clan accepted the call to Jihad. The Habr Maqdi clan was among the first tribes to accept Jihad alongside the Geri clan under Garad Matan. It's documented that they encamped in Qasa a place near Harar.

Arab Faqih notes:

“At that time the imam organised his forces and called up his army. He tied a white standard to a spear, and entrusted it to wazir 'Addoli, and the people of Sim rallied to him from the tribe of the Somalis, the Habr Maqdi and the tribe of Ahmad Girri, and with them two-hundred cavalry and two thousand infantry, like savage lions.”

== See also ==
- Ahmad ibn Ibrahim al-Ghazi
- Adal Sultanate
- Jidwaq
- Matan ibn Uthman Al Somali
- Garad Hirabu Goita Tedros Al Somali
