= Facaaye =

Somali Clan

Facaaye فعايه
Regions with significant populations
- Somalia (Jubaland, Galgaduud); Ethiopia (Somali Region, Afar Region)

Languages
- Somali

Religion
- Islam

Related ethnic groups
- Marehan and other Darod groups

The Facaaye (Somali: Facaye, Arabic: فعايه), (Faysal bin Ahmed bin Abdirahman bin Is'mail bin Ibrahim al Jaberti), is a Somali clan, part of one of the major Darod subclans; the Sade clan family. The majority of the Facaye clan live in Jubaland,and Galgaduud, particularly in Bardhere, Kismayo, Jilib and Abudwak. The rest of the tribe can be found deep in Ethiopia.

== History ==
The Facaaye clan historically straddled a territory spanning from the mountains of Afar to the Wollo province of Amhara, specifically the Angot province, east of Tigray and they were historically known as the Dobe'a people. According to Francisco Álvares, they possessed the most livestock in the world, rich in animals such as cattle and goats.

One of their largest towns was Manadeley, which was known for being a centre of commerce and described as being like a seaport, where goods from all across the world could be found such as Jeddah, Fez, elsewhere in Morocco, Tunis, Greece, Ormus, Cairo, and India.Their lands were the economic lifeline of the Sultanate of Adal, as they controlled the salt trade, holding one of the largest salt lakes in the world at Lake Assal, their strategic location near the Bab-el-Mandeb strait would also mean one of the capitals of the Sultanate of Ifat was situated in their territory. Numerous mosques and city ruins have been found in the lands inhabited by the tribe.

The Facaaye were also a powerful warrior tribe which conducted raids on neighboring Abyssinian provinces for decades, and were one of the prime tribes who fought alongside Mahfuz during his raids on Abyssinian borders.

After the destruction of the Marehan Imamate of Aussa, the Sade tribes would migrate east of the Awash valley and begin settling Dire Dawa and Harar. The Asaimara Mudaito dynasty Afar would massacre the native Sade clans, causing the forced migration and thus the formation of the Gobad sultanate, however the Oromo expansion would cause the Afar and Somali Sade clans to ally in order to ward off the greater enemy, forming the Assaimara and Adoimara confederations. The Sade tribes would create the Debne and We'ima tribes, who remained allies for centuries to battle of the Assaimara. Later, due to unknown circumstances, likely due to civil war, the Marehan would be completely wiped out of the Afar Region.

Account of Sir William Cornwallis Haris of the Facaaye and Marehan clans:

The rainy season having now fairly set in, it was believed that the pools on the upper road would furnish a sufficient supply of water, and the course was accordingly shaped towards it. Emerging upon the extensive plain of Merihan, bounded to the westward by the lofty peaked range of Feeoh, the route skirted the Bundoora hills, thickly clothed with grass, and varying in height from six hundred to a thousand feet. Wayess, the chief of the Woema, formerly held his head-quarters in this neighbourhood, at Hagaio-dera-dubba; but the Eesah Somauli making frequent inroads, and at last sweeping off all the cattle of the tribe, it was abandoned.

== Clan tree ==
- Sade
  - Facaaye
  - Marehan
- Facaaye
  - Humbeelle
  - Higsed
- Humbeelle
  - Reer Allamagan
  - Reer Xoosh
  - Reer Khayr
    - Reer Xassan Khayr
    - Reer Maxamed Khayr
    - Reer Axmed Khayr
      - Reer Dhuubow Axmed
      - Reer Xassan Axmed
      - Reer Cali Axmed
      - Reer Faarax Axmed
      - Abiy
