= Abdullahi Bile Noor =

Somali politician (born 1965)

Abdullahi Bile Noor ﻋﺒﺪ ﺍﻟﻠﻪ بيلي ﻧﻮﺭ

State Minister of Post, Telecommunication & Technology of Somalia
- In office 21 March 2017 – Incumbent

Member of the Federal Parliament of Somalia
- In office 13 Aug 2000 – Serving
- Constituency: Bosaso _ Bari

State Minister of Education, Cultural & Higher Education of Somalia
- In office 2015–2017

Assistant Minister of Information, Postal Cooperation and Telecommunication of Somalia
- In office 2011–2012

Personal details
- Born: 1965 (age 60–61) Bosaso, Bari Somalia
- Party: Independent
- Education: Somali National University

Abdullahi Bile Noor (Somali: Cabdulaahi Bile Nuur, Arabic: ﻋﺒﺪ ﺍﻟﻠﻪ بيلي ﻧﻮﺭ), better known as Bile, is a Somali politician. He served for many years in the government and has extensive experience in public policy, public administration and business. He currently serves as Member of the Federal Parliament of Somalia and a member of the current cabinet. He is one of Somalia's longest serving national legislators.

== Career ==
Bile served for the government for many years and was a cabinet member for various Somali governments. He is one of the country's most popular politicians due to his long-time national service.

On August 13, 2000, Bile was selected as a member of the newly installed transitional parliament of Somalia; he still holds this post.

On 17 January 2015, Bile was appointed the new State Minister of Post, Telecommunication and Technology of Somalia by Prime Minister Hassan Ali Khaire.

He previously served as Assistant Minister of Information, Postal Cooperation and Telecommunication of Somalia later formed part of government served as State Minister of Justice. Bile was later switched into Ministry of Education, Cultural & Higher Education of Somalia where he served as State Minister.

== Early life ==
Bile is originally from northeastern Puntland. He hails Dishiishe clan and was born in the coastal town of Bosaso in the northeastern Bari region of Somalia.

He graduated with honor from Somali National University.
