= Fatimo Isaak Bihi =

Somali former diplomat

Fatimo Isaak Bihi is a Somali former diplomat. She was the first ever female ambassador (Ambassador to Switzerland). Bihi is also the former Director of the African Department of the Ministry of Foreign Affairs, as well as being a former Permanent Representative for Somalia at the United Nations.
