= Abdi Shire Warsame =

Somali politician and diplomat

Dr. Abdi Shire Warsame

Dr. Abdi Shire Warsame (Somali: Cabdi Shiire Warsame, Arabic: عبدي شيري وارسام), is a Somali diplomat who was the former Somali Ambassador to Iran and Kenya and former Foreign Affairs State minister in the Transitional National Government. He has played several roles in the past major Somali reconciliation conferences as well as holding several positions in the Transitional National Government.
