= Jijiga Gerad Wilwal Airport =

Airport in Jijiga, Somali Region, Ethiopia

Gerad Wilwal Airport
- IATA: JIJ; ICAO: HAJJ

Summary
- Airport type: Public
- Operator: Ethiopian Airports Enterprise
- Serves: Jijiga, Ethiopia
- Elevation AMSL: 5,937 ft (1,810 m)
- Coordinates: 09°19′51″N 042°54′40″E

Map
- Location within Ethiopia

Runways
Direction	Length		Surface
Direction	m	ft	Surface
03/21	2,500	8,202	Asphalt
- Source:, STV

Gerad Wilwal Airport (IATA: JIJ, ICAO: HAJJ) (also known as Garaad Wiil-Waal Airport) is a public airport serving Jijiga, the capital city of the Somali Region in eastern Ethiopia. The airport is located at 09°19′56″N 42°54′43″E, which is 12 km (7 miles) east of the city. It is named after seventeenth-century jigjiga ruler Wiil Waal.

Jijiga's original airfield is located northwest of the city center at 09°21′38″N 42°47′16″E.

== History ==
The first airfield at Jijiga was constructed in 1929. An airplane crash at Jijiga in July 1930 involved the eighth or ninth aircraft introduced to Ethiopia; it was the second airplane disaster in the country. The plane was a Fiat AS-1 with 85 hp engine, a training airplane bought in 1929. The first tests in air pilot training in Ethiopia were passed at the Garad Wilwal Airport by Mishka Babitcheff and Asfaw Ali on 1 and 4 September 1930.

By the 1990s, the Garad Wilwal Airport was one of 10 bases of the Ethiopian Air Force.

== Facilities ==
The airport resides at an elevation of 5,937 feet (1,810 m) above mean sea level. The airport's only runway, designated 03/21, has an asphalt surface and measures 2,400 by 45 metres (7,874 ft × 148 ft).

== Airlines and destinations ==
Airlines	Destinations
Ethiopian Airlines	Addis Ababa, Gode
