= Hinda Abdi Mohamoud =

Somali journalist

- Citizenship: Somalia
- Occupation: journalist
- Employer: Bilan Media
- Notable work: Raad Somali
- Awards: 2023 Index on Censorship Press Freedom Award

Hinda Abdi Mohamoud is a Somali journalist and the chief editor of Somalia's first and only independent all-women media outlet.

== Biography ==
Mohamoud grew up in Hargeisa. She aspired to be a journalist from a young age. She holds a degree in international relations from New Generation University, Hargeisa, Somalia.

Mohamoud self-published the book Raad Somali (Somali Footprints), which explores the question of the origins of the Somali people, before working as a journalist. She works as chief editor of the publication Bilan Media, Somalia's first and only independent all-women media outlet, where her work has included taboo subjects such as HIV, people living with Alzheimers disease and people with albinism shunned by their communities. Bilan launched in 2022 with funding from the United Nations, and in 2023 Mohamoud and her team were one of three nominees for the 2023 Index on Censorship Press Freedom Award in the Journalism category, winning the award.

Mohamoud has also written articles covering the displaced people who have been living in camps in the Somali capital Mogadishu for decades, raising awareness of the need for more female journalists in the Global South and covering other social issues. She has contributed to the Index on Censorship's quarterly magazine.

Mohamoud was named a BBC 100 Women in 2024.
