= Matan ibn Uthman Al Somali =

General of the Adal Sultanate

General of the Somali Adalite Division Garad Matan ibn Uthman Al-Somali متن بن عثمان بن خالد الصومالي
- Matan Uthman
- Born: Matan ibn Uthman ibn Khalid c. 1490; Zeila, Adal Sultanate
- Died: 28 October 1531 (aged 40–41); Ambassel, Abyssinian Empire
- Spouse: Fardowsa Bint Ibrahim
- Relatives: Brother in-law of Imam Ahmed
- Military career
- Allegiance: Adal Sultanate
- Rank: Division Commander
- Commands: Somali Adalite Division
- Known for: Conquest of Abyssinia
- Conflicts: Battle of Amba Sel; Battle of Buro

Matan ibn Uthman ibn Khalid (Somali: Mataan Ibnu Cismaan ibnu Khaalid, Arabic: متن بن عثمان بن خالد) born c. early 1490 – 28 October 1531, also known as Garad Matan, was a Somali military commander and Adalite general that served the Adal Sultanate. He led key and decisive battles, famously in charge of the Somali divisions. He was also the brother-in-law of Imam Ahmed and his right-hand man. Garad Matan played a very prominent role in the campaigns against the Abyssinians, killing the son of Lebna Dengel, Victor. Garad Matan hailed from the Geri Koombe clan. He was regarded one of the most courageous military generals in East Africa, well documented in the Futuh Al Habash.

== Early life ==
Born into the powerful Geri Koombe clan, a branch of the Darood, he was a key figure in the Muslim conquests in the Horn of Africa. He began his career as a knight, similar to his brother-in-law, Imam Ahmed, who also began as a knight. Both Garad Matan and Imam Ahmed were from the same clan, Geri koombe. Matan ascended up the ranks until becoming a military general, and was explicitly hailed as one of the greatest knight. Garad Mattan later married the sister of Imam Ahmed, her name was Fardowsa.

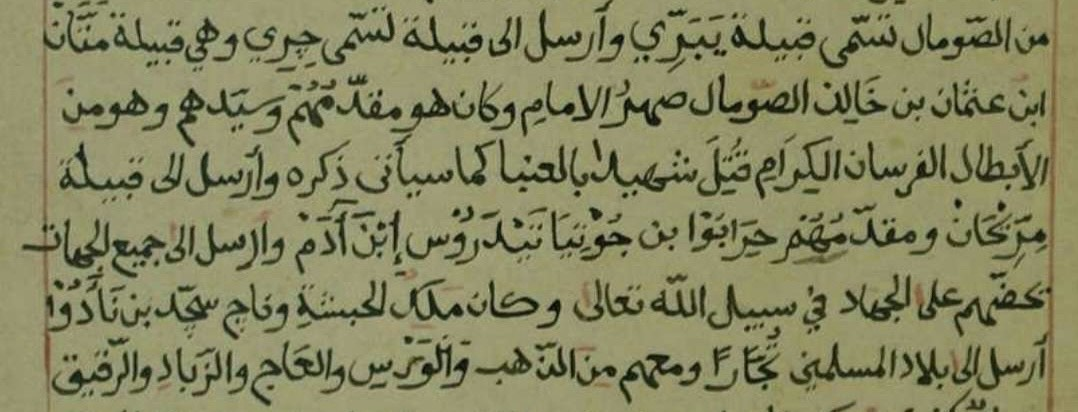
16th century manuscript about Garad Matan

== Family ==
Garad Matan serving as a military general under the Adal Sultanate had a close and personal relationship with the Imam. Garad Matan was married to the sister of the Imam, Her name was Fardawsa. This shaped a close relationship with Imam Ahmed. Garad Matan also had a brother by the name Ali Garad who also participated in the conquests of Abyssinia, notably praised for braverly fighting in Shimbre Kura.

The Tribe of Girri who came up. Their chieftain was Garad Matan ibn Uthman, the Somali. They showed off their weaponry and armour, paraded their horses and had their bows slung sash-like over their shoulders as they met the imam face to face. He commanded them then to go ahead to a place called "Sim". Their chieftain Matan had brought with him his wife, Fardawsa, the sister of the imam Ahmad. And he set out ahead, he and his army.

== Military campaigns ==
Garad Matan, a talented horseman, commanded the Somali Adalite Division in combat. The Geri Koombe created a great big army of knights, horsemen, and foot warriors totaling 3,000 men, who were accompanied by their brethren clans Harti Koombe, Jairan Koombe, and Harla Koombe, all of whom were Darod.

The Imam then attached a crimson banner to a spear and gave it to his brother-in-law Garad Matan Bin Uthman ibn Khalid, their captain, knight, and the most daring, bravest of them all. There were 110 knights and 3,000 troops, as well as the Somali tribes of Harti Koombe, Jairan Koombe, and Mazra Koombe, all of whom rallied to him.

Like previously mentioned Garaad Matan led key battles for the Adal sultanate, also famously leading the Somali Adalite Division. The Imam gathered all the Somali tribes and made them one unit entrusting the unit to his Brother In law Garad Matan.

The tribe of the Somalis said, "it was the tribe of Harla?" that gave us away; while the tribe of Harla said, 'it was the Somali tribe that gave us away The imam split his forces into three divisions: all the Somalis were in one division whose command he entrusted to Matan. Then he [the imam] tied a red standard to a spear and entrusted it to his brother-in-law Mattan bin 'Utman bin Kaled, the Somali, their chieftain, their knight, and the most courageous, the bravest of them all. There rallied to him one-hundred-and-ten knights and three-thousand infantry, along with the tribe of Harti, ' the tribe of Jairan and the tribe of Mazra, all of whom were Somalis.

In 1531 the Adalites was able to inflict a crushing defeat on the Abyssinians during the Battle of Antukyah which allowed the Adalites to Conquer Fatager and Shewa. Adalite forces killed and captured Elite patricians, Among the famous patricians was the governor of Begmeder Azmac Yeshaq who was killed by a Somali called Ali Madajir who was from the tribe of Matan ibn uthman the Somali, The number of patricians killed was staggering, the futuh reports exactly 130 Amhara and Tigrayan patricians were killed Then the Imam dispatched his right-hand man and brother in law Garad Matan Al Somali who then conquered Eastern Shewa then General Matan Al Somali drove his adalite forces and conquered Bete Amhara ( House Of Amhara ) by the end of the year Dawit II fell back behind the Abay River to seek refuge in Gojjam much deeper into the highlands.

=== Garad Matan sacks the home of Lebna Dengel ===
The Imam then commanded Garad Matan along with Farasaham to conquer Andutna this place itself was considered to be the royal towns of the Abyssinian kings. according to historical scholars modern day Andutna is a settlement near north of Addis Abbaba known as Entotto. Nevertheless, when Garad Matan and Farasaham arrived they conquered Andutna and arrived at its church and sacked, it. Arab faqih gives an explicit descriptive account of the sacking of the church.

Arab Faqih writes

They set out, arrived and burned the church down. Its acroterial ornaments were of gold, and the cross above it was of red gold. They stripped it of its gold and burnt it and plundered its furnishings, which the Christians of the village had left behind in three trenches. But as for gold, they found nothing there apart from what they took from the church.

Imam then reunited with Garad Matan after arriving back from Dukam, the Imam and Matan then arrived at the home of Lebna Dengel, Andutna was the home of Lebna Dengel, Matan and the imam entered the house and at first were amazed at it but they then subsequently burned it down, Arab Faqih gives an even more descriptive account Arab Faqih notes

The imam, meantime, marched with his army from Dukam and entered Andutna, a village of the king Wanag Sagad. To return to Farasaham 'Ali and Mattan the two of them joined the imam in the above- mentioned village. In Andutna was the house of the Abyssinian king, in which were paintings, images of lions, of human beings, of birds, depicted in red, yellow, green and white and other colours. The Muslims entered the house, and were amazed at what was in it; and then burnt it.

=== Garad Matan kills Lebna Dengal's son ===
After the imam and Garad matan laid siege to Andutna, the eldest son of Lebna Dengel named victor was captured and killed by Garad Matan, according to historians Victor was next in line to the throne.

=== Surprise attack on Imam Ahmed's camp, ===
Imam Ahmed's camp was a subject to surprise attacks from the Abyssinian stragglers. The Christians had descended from the highlands during the night while all the Adalite forces were asleep, they were famous for using poisoned spears. Garad Matan had then noticed the Abyssinian stragglers at his camp. the Abyssinians then shot their spears directly at Matan, Matan then galloped on his horse courageously pushed and chased the Abyssinian stragglers away.

The storyteller, says: When a quarter of the night had passed, there was a surprise attack on the perimeter of the camp by the idol-worshippers who had fought the Muslims on the terrace of the mountain. They shot their arrows into the area where Matan the Somali was. He mounted his horse and put them to flight in the dark until he drove them back up the mountain. Then he returned to his camp. None of the Muslims were harmed.

== Death ==
In the Battle of Amba Sel the chieftain of Geri, Garad Matan ibn Uthman was killed. When the imam heard of the news of the death of his brother in law he cried becoming emotional he said the Islamic Istirja "for verily we belong to Allah and we will return to him". The imam had prayed for him.

The companions of Garad Ahmusa who had been routed, reached the imam on the day of his march against the Amba. They informed him about what had happened. He was saddened on account of his brother-in-law Mattan, said the prayer "Truly to God we belong, and unto Him do we return", and wept.

== See also ==
- Ahmad ibn Ibrahim al-Ghazi
- Adal Sultanate
- Geri Koombe
- Dervish movement (Somali)
