= Jijiga =

Capital of Somali Region, Ethiopia

Jijiga Jigjiga (Somali) ጅጅጋ (Amharic) جيجيجا (Arabic) Laaca
- Capital city
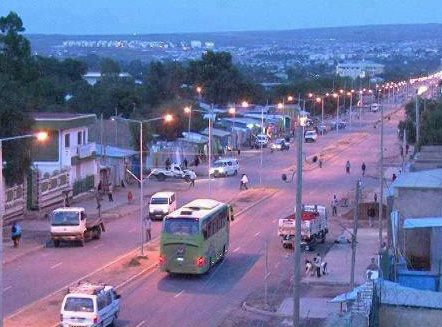
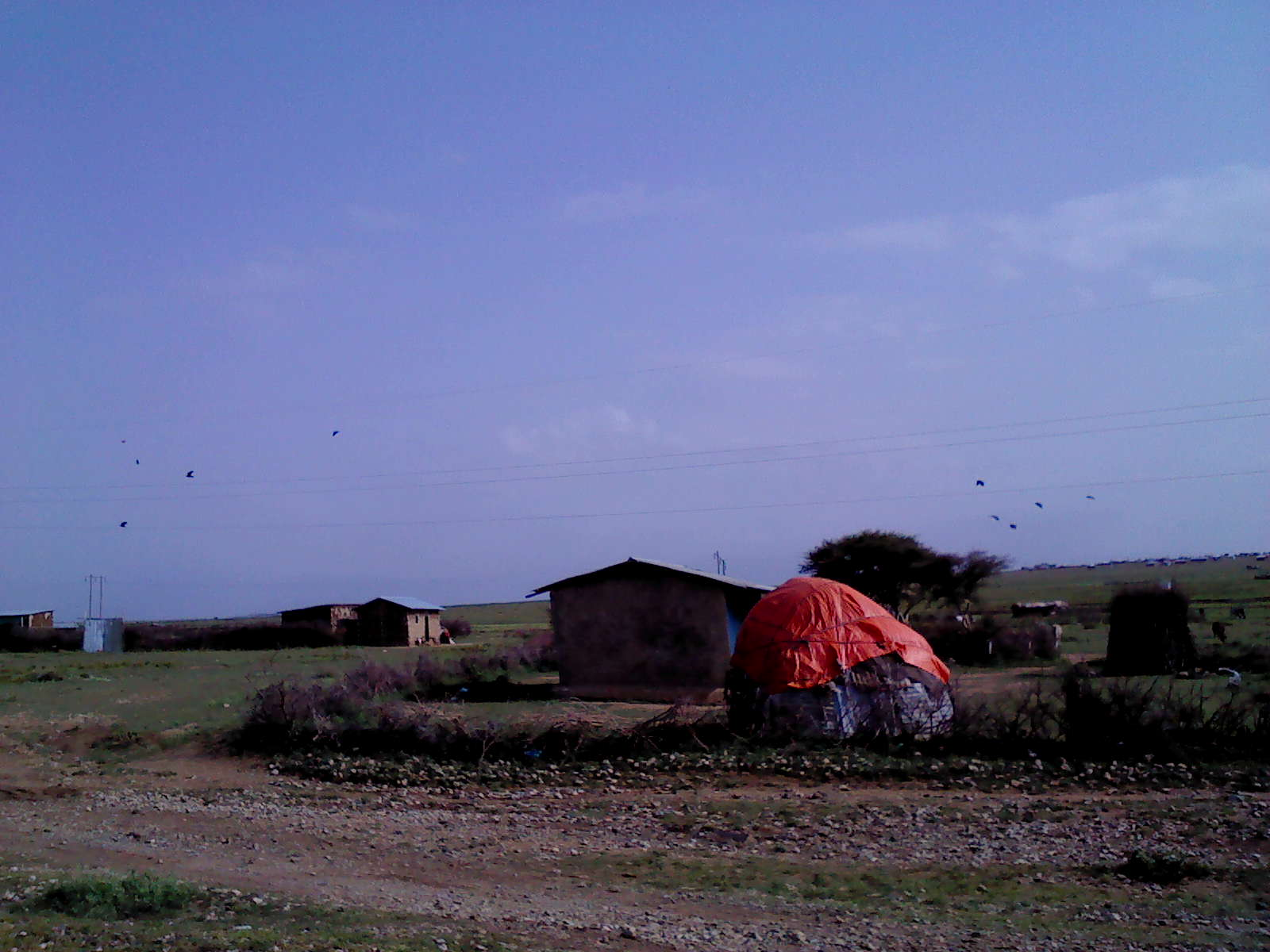
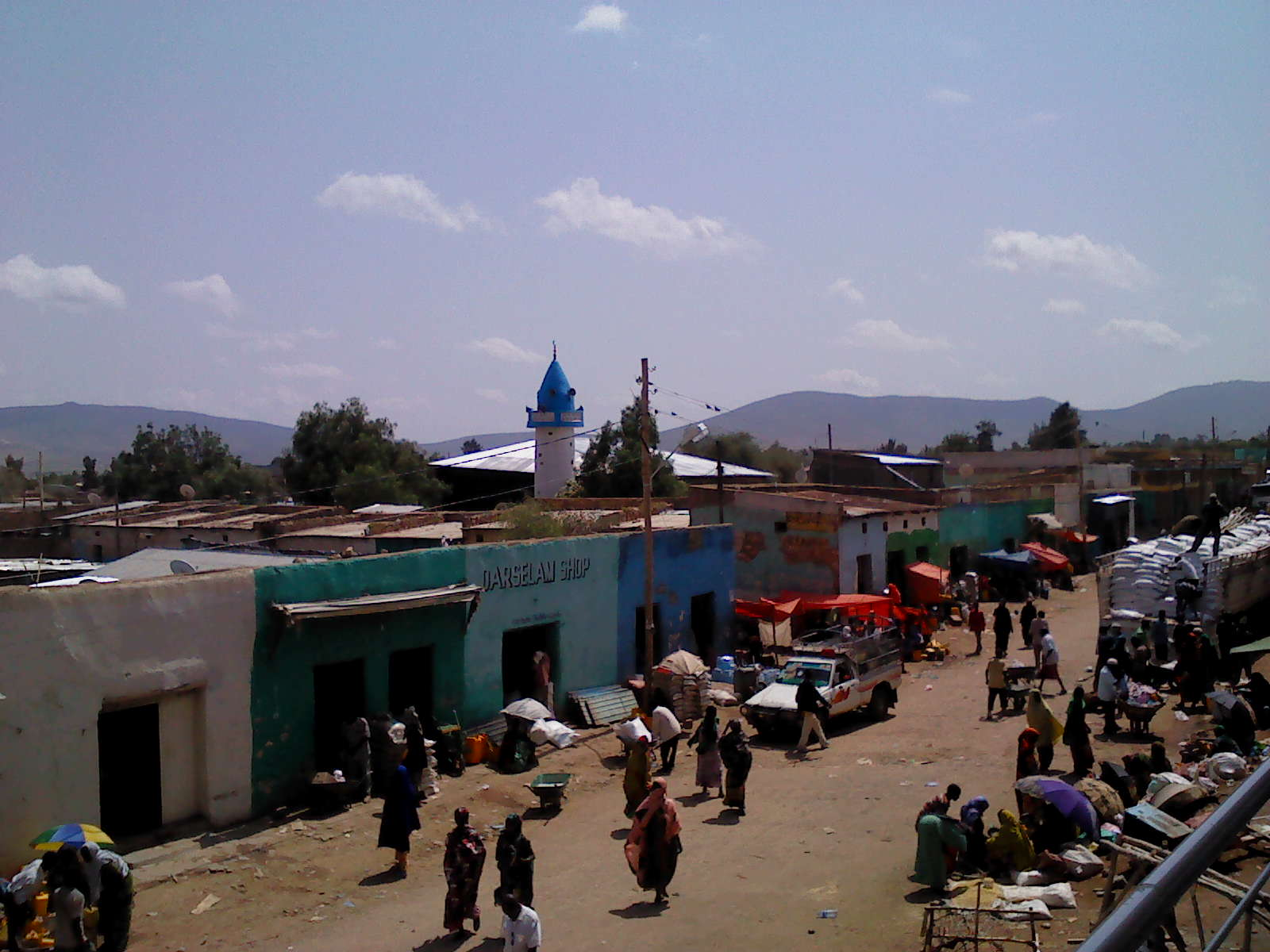
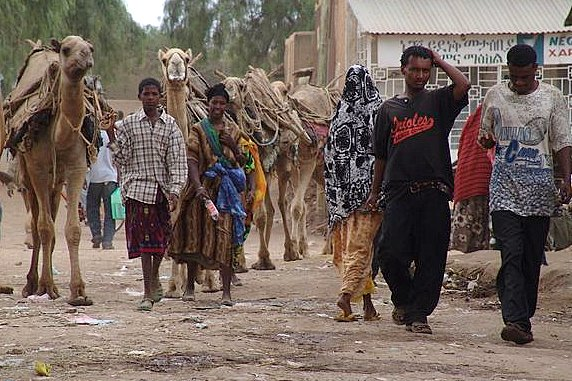
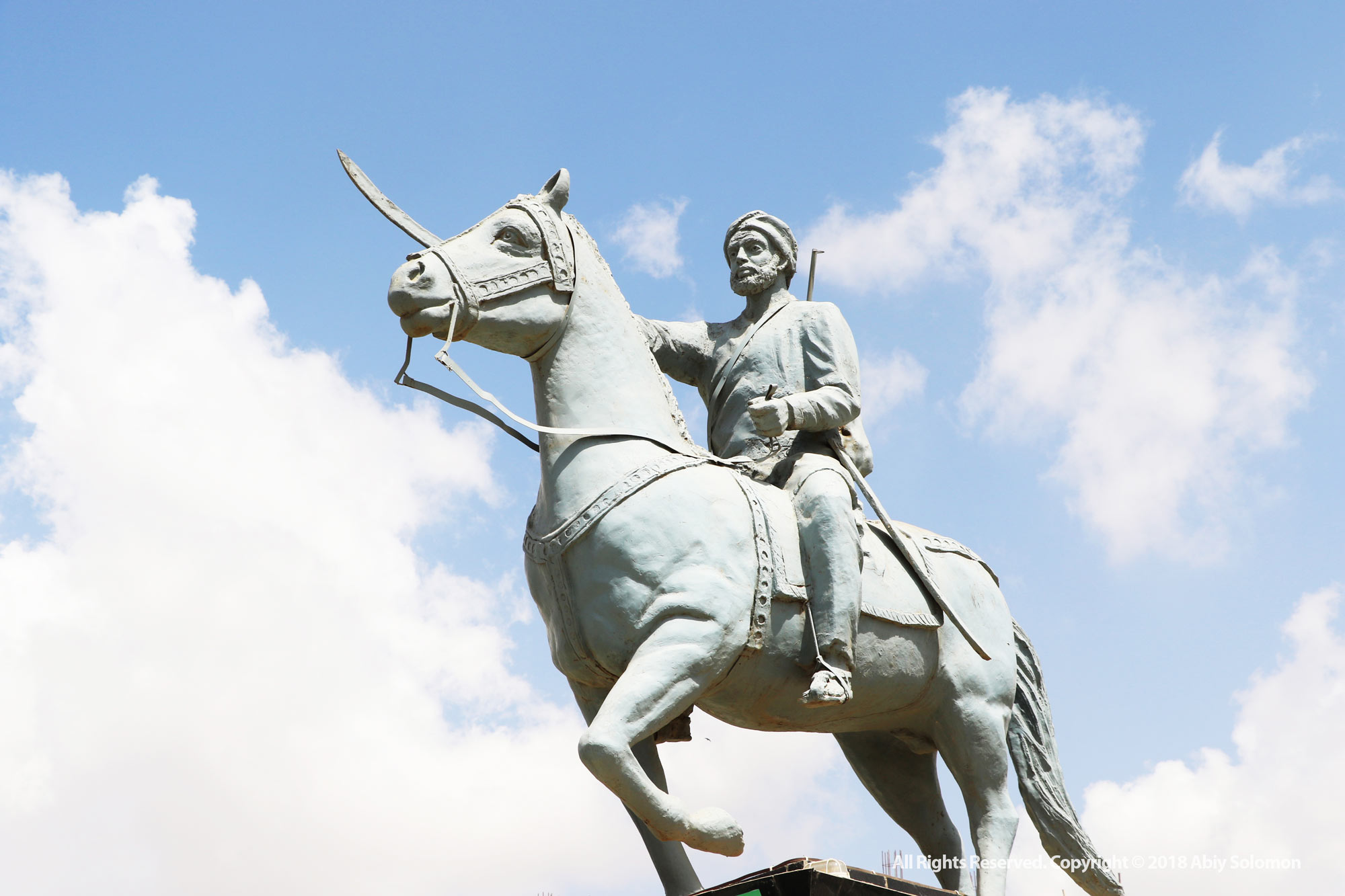
- From left: Dusk view of Jijiga; Outskirt of Jijiga; Metropolis of Jijiga; Jigjiga's camel transportation; Sayyid Mohammed Statue

- Location within Ethiopia Location within the Horn of Africa Location within Africa
- Coordinates: 9°21′N 42°48′E
- Country: Ethiopia
- Region: Somali
- Zone: Fafan

Government
  - Mayor: Shafi Ahmed Macalin
- Elevation: 1,634 m (5,361 ft)

Population (2007)
  - Total: 203,588
  - Density: 1,456/km^{2} (3,770/sq mi)
- estimated
- Time zone: UTC+3 (EAT)

Jijiga (Somali: Jigjiga, Amharic: ጅጅጋ, romanized: Jijiga) is the capital city of Somali Region, Ethiopia. It became the capital of the Somali Region in 1995 after it was moved from Gode. Located in the Fafan Zone with 75 km (37 mi) west of the border with Somaliland, the city has an elevation of 1,634 metres above sea level. Jigjiga is traditionally the seat of the Bartire Garad Wiil-Waal of the Jidwaaq Absame. The International airport is named after him.

== Etymology ==
The name Jigjiga is said to come from the onomatopoeic word jig-jig, representing the rumbling sounds made by an earthquake, or the noise from water wells on the outskirts of the city. Jigjiga is an example of many onomatopoeic words in Somali.

== History ==
The region around Jijiga is believed to be associated with the medieval Gidaya state which existed as early as thirteenth century. One of the earliest references to Jijiga comes from W.C. Barker in 1842 who mentions it as one of the mahalla or halting-places of the caravan route between Zeila and Harar within the Somali inhabited Ogaden (present day Somali Region). Jijiga was later mentioned by British traveler Richard Francis Burton in 1854, who reports that it was a centre of wells for pastoralists of the local Somali (Jidwaq) clan on the caravan route to Berbera. During the pre-colonial era the Ogaden was neither under Ethiopian rule, nor terra nullius, as it was occupied by organized Somali communities. Independent historical accounts are unanimous that previous to the penetration into the region in the late 1880s, Somali clans were free of residing in the Ogaden were free of the control of the Ethiopian Empire.

In 1887, the Ethiopian Empire under Menelik II invaded and conquered the ancient city of Harar and soon after announced a programme of ambitious expansion and colonialism to the European powers. This marked the start of a tentative yet violent invasion into the Ogaden region. During the Abyssinian invasion of Harar, much of the population and the cities Islamic scholars were massacred. As a consequence of this some scholars moved to the town of Jigjiga, and from a Somali perspective Jigjiga then replaced Harar as a center for Islamic learning. As Emperor Menelik II continued his campaign of indiscriminate raiding and attacks against the Somalis of the Ogaden region between 1890 and 1899, Somali clans residing in the plains of Jigjiga were in particular targeted. The escalating frequency and violence of the raids resulted in Somalis consolidating behind the Dervish movement under the lead of Sayyid Mohamed Abdullah Hassan.

As the Ethiopian Empire began expanding into Somali territories at the start of the 1890s, the town of Jigjiga came under intermittent military occupation until 1900. An imperial garrison was established at Jijiga in 1891, which later became a base for Ethiopian military campaigns into the Somali-inhabited lowlands. British hunter Colonel Swayne, who passed through Jijiga in February 1893, where he described seeing stockaded fort with a garrison. During 1895, it was observed that the fort set up in the town was often abandoned by the Abyssinians, who usually occupied it to carry out raids on the Somalis of the Ogaden. Abdullah Tahir was appointed governor of Jigjiga in 1896, this would be the emergence of Jigjiga's urban development. In this period Abyssinian settlers began arriving in the town from nearby garrisons.

During early 1900, Abyssinian troops began a permanent occupation of the town with the construction of a military fort in the outskirts. Subsequently, the anti-colonial Dervish Movement led by Sayid Mohamed Abdullah Hassan had its first major battle when it attacked the Ethiopian forces occupying Jigjiga several to free livestock that had been looted from the local population during Abyssinian raids. Sayid Mohameds Dervish attack greatly shook the Ethiopians, and resulted in them coordinating large scale joint military operations with the British Empire against the Somalis fighters. Governor Tahir set up a native security forces to protect the town which consisted mainly of Somalis and Harari people as the Dervish fighters had begun its activities in the region. The Ethiopian control in the Ogaden at the start of the 20th century was tenuous as administrators and military personnel only resided in Jijiga and Harar.

After reportedly adopting the Islamic faith, uncrowned Emperor Lij Iyasu had a close relationship with the Muslim Somalis. In Jigjiga he built several mosques and sent military aid to the Somali Dervish movement. During the summer of 1916, Lysau travelled to Jigjiga to organize an army of Somali fighters to follow him in a jihad against the Christians. When he left for Jigjiga, the Shewan imperial elite revolted against him. After Lij Lyasu's overthrowal and the subsequent tensions in the town, the Somali population abandoned Jigjiga, leaving behind only Amhara settlers, who were mostly soldiers. Due to widespread Somali hostility in the Ogaden, the town marked the effective boundary of imperial presence in the region. Succeeding governors such as Tekle Hawariat Tekle Mariyam, had the town methodically organized in a square grid of streets, built a fort, dug several wells, encouraged agriculture, and set a fixed land tax. Actions which Richard Pankhurst claims won the hearts of the Ogaden Somalis. During the 1920s and 1930s, Somalis began returning to the town.

During the Second Italo-Ethiopian War, Jijiga served for some time as Dejazmach Nasibu Emmanual's headquarters and a supply center for the Ethiopian army. An Italian force under Colonel Navarra occupied the city on the evening of 5 May 1936. Two days later, while inspecting a ruined Ethiopian Orthodox church in the city, Marshal Rodolfo Graziani fell into a concealed hole, which he was afterwards convinced was a mantrap; Anthony Mockler suggests this mishap contributed to his murderously paranoid mindset which led to the atrocities that followed the attempt on Graziani's life 19 February 1937. During Italian rule of the city, mosques were built by the new rulers Under the rule of the Ethiopian Empire, the construction of mosques had been stifled. Under Italian rule, Islam was given official recognition by the new ruling administration and mosques were constructed in Jigjiga. Arabic was also introduced in the schools set up for Italian East Africa's Muslim subjects.

=== British ===
On 17 March 1941, during the East African Campaign of World War II, Jijiga was occupied by the 23rd Nigerian Brigade of the British 1st African Division. This was after the Italian garrison had already abandoned the city. In 1948, the British Military Administration, which had been in control of the Ogaden since WWII, commenced a withdrawal. This transition saw the replacement of British officials with Ethiopian counterparts between May and July of that year in a significant handover process. In the town of Jijiga, incoming Ethiopian authorities instructed the Somali Youth League (SYL) to remove their flag, as they had declared both the party and its emblem as unlawful. The SYL defied this directive, leading to the flag being machine-gunned by an armored vehicle. This event escalated following the killing of a police officer after a grenade was thrown of the roof of the SYL headquarters. The police responded by firing into a crowd of protesters killing 25. Following this incident, Ethiopian administration resumed in Jijiga for the first time in 13 years. Then, on 23 September 1948, following the withdrawal of British forces and the appointment of Ethiopian district commissioners, areas east of Jijiga were placed under Ethiopian governance for the first time in history.

=== Handover ===
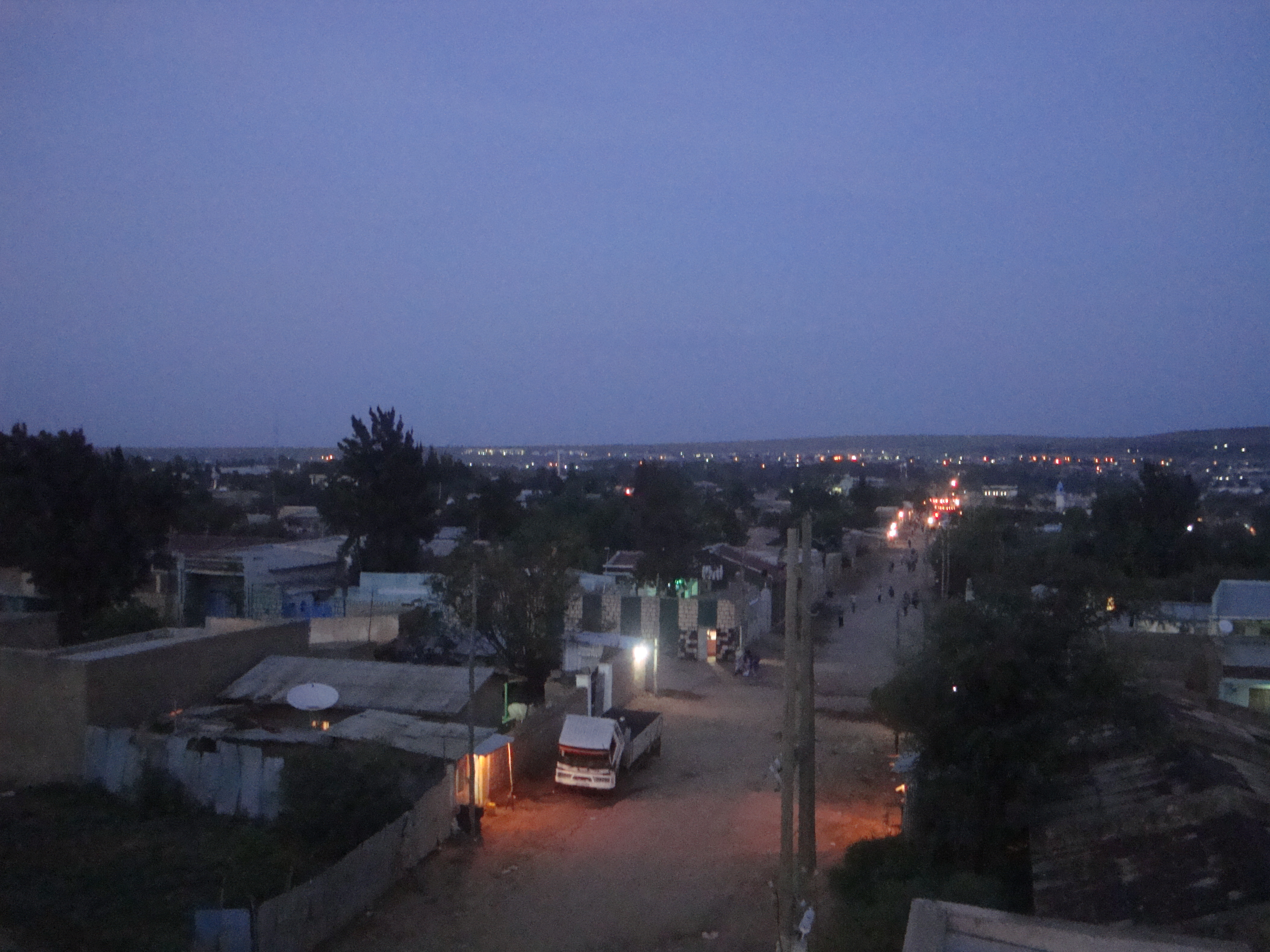
Jijiga at night.

Germame Neway, one of the leaders of the unsuccessful 1960 coup, served as governor over Jijiga in 1959. He had been transferred there for his civic responsibility and concern for the underprivileged while administering a district in Sidamo Province. The obstruction he encountered, not only in Sidamo but in Jijiga, convinced him of the need for radical measures. In the early stage of the Ethiopian Revolution individual units from the Third Division put the local governor under house arrest around 13 April 1974. During the Ogaden War, Jijiga experienced the Battle of Jijiga and was occupied by the Western Somali Liberation Front's Ahmad ibn Ibrihim al-Ghazi division led by Col. Yusuf Dheere, later with the Somali National Army, from September 1977 until February/March 1978.

The Regional government held a conference in this city to promote peace and development between 10 and 13 March 1996, which was attended by 535 from the local woredas, as well as the Deputy Prime Minister and Defense Minister of Ethiopia, Tamirat Layne, the Foreign Minister, Seyoum Mesfin, the presidents of the Tigray and Harari Regional states and representatives from Amhara and the Southern Nations, Nationalities, and People's Regions. On 28 May 2007, during the celebration of Ginbot 20 (celebrating the downfall of the Derg), Jijiga and Degehabur were the scenes of attacks on civilians and government officials. At least 16 people were killed and 67 injured, including Abdulahi Hassan Mohammed, president of the Somali Region, who was speaking at the ceremony. The Ethiopian government blamed the attack on the Ogaden National Liberation Front.

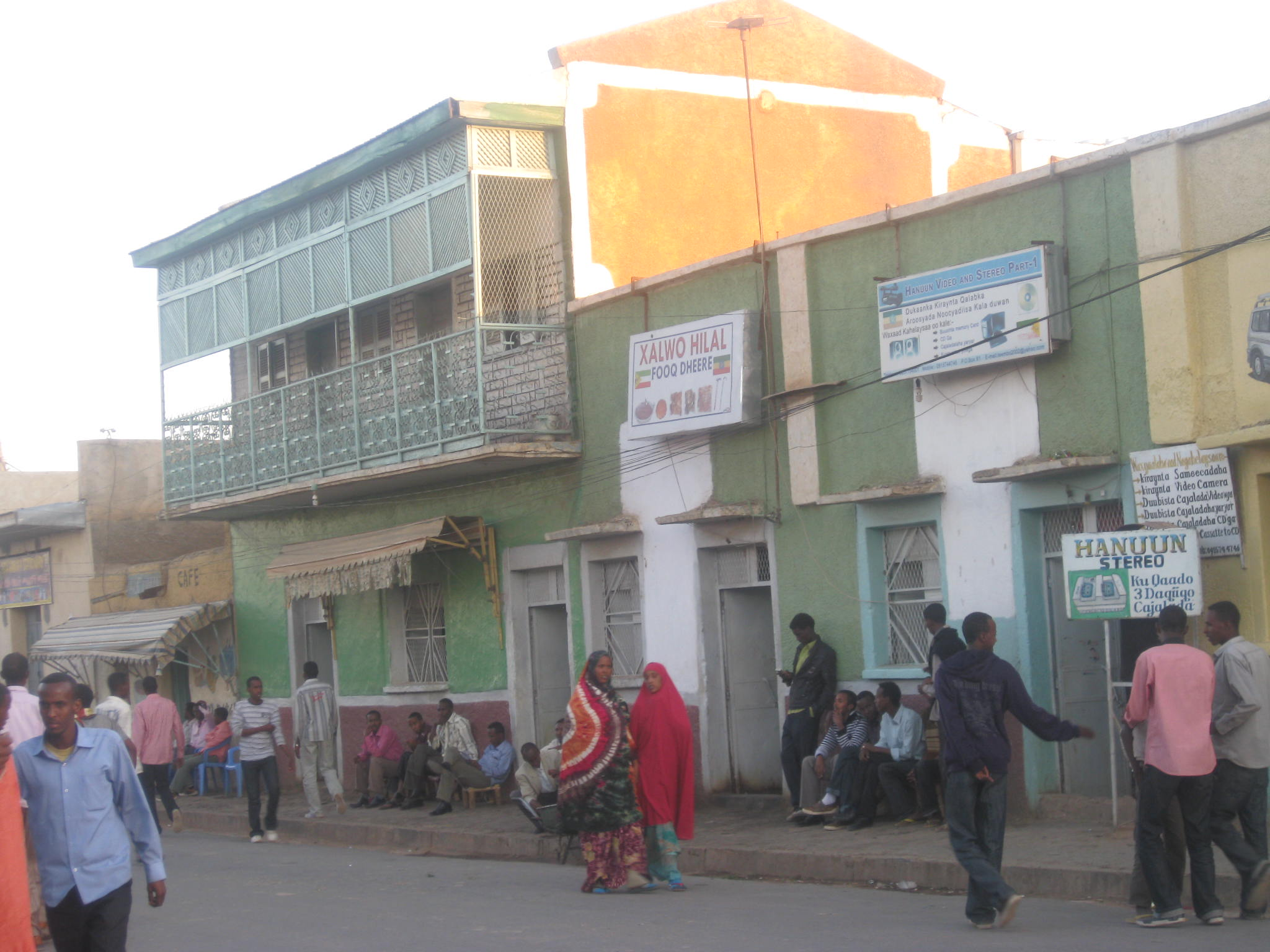
Historic Fooq Dheere building in Jijiga.

On 29 May 2008, following a heavy downpour the Jijiga River broke its banks and flooded several kebeles in the town and the vicinity. The flooding killed 29 people and displaced 350 households. On 27 September of that year, a bomb exploded outside a hotel in Jijiga killing four and wounding 20. Local police apprehended a suspect whom they claimed was a member of Al-Itihaad al-Islamiya.

== Demographics ==
Ethnic groups of Jigjiga (2007)
1. Somali (82.8%)
2. Amhara (8.27%)
3. Oromo (4.31%)
4. Gurage (2.15%)
5. Other (2.48%)

Based on the 2007 Census conducted by the Central Statistical Agency of Ethiopia (CSA), Jijiga had a total population of 203,588 of whom 109,138 were men and 94,450 women. Ethnic groups in the city include the Somali (168,551, 82.79%), Amhara (16,837, 8.27%), Oromo (8,775, 4.31%), and Gurage (4,379, 2.15%); all other groups made up 2.48% of the total population. Members of Somali clans in this city include the Jidwaaq, Akisho, Ogaden, Gadabuursi and Geri Koombe, and the Sa'ad Musa subclan of the Habr Awal, with a minor presence of some other clans like the Sheekhaal.

The results of the 1994 census in the Somali Region were not satisfactory, so the census was repeated in 1997. This census reported this town had a total population of 65,795 of whom 33,266 were male and 32,529 female. The predominant religion in this city Jijiga is Muslim. As of 1997, the ethnic composition of the town was 61.58% Somali, 23.25% Amhara, 7.32% Oromo and 4.37% Gurage, and 1.48% Tigrayan; all other ethnic groups made up 1.99% of the population. This city is the largest in the whole Somali region.

== Climate ==
The climate of Jijiga is a subtropical highland climate (Köppen climate classification: Cwb). extremely wet and lush during rainy season, as with the rest of the Ethiopian highlands, Seasonal differences relate only to rainfall, as temperatures year-round are cool to mild in the mornings and uniformly very warm though not hot during the afternoons.

There are two rainy seasons: the main meher rains occur from July to September, and the short belg rains in April and June. The dry season, known as bega, is cooler by morning than the wet seasons due to lower cloud cover, but equally hot by afternoon though less humid.

Climate data for Jijiga, elevation 1,644 m (5,394 ft)
Month	Jan	Feb	Mar	Apr	May	Jun	Jul	Aug	Sep	Oct	Nov	Dec	Year
Mean daily maximum °C (°F)	27.6 (81.7)	28.8 (83.8)	29.5 (85.1)	28.5 (83.3)	28.8 (83.8)	27.9 (82.2)	26.8 (80.2)	26.9 (80.4)	27.5 (81.5)	28.1 (82.6)	27.8 (82.0)	27.2 (81.0)	28.0 (82.3)
Mean daily minimum °C (°F)	8.5 (47.3)	10.1 (50.2)	11.9 (53.4)	13.7 (56.7)	14.5 (58.1)	15.5 (59.9)	15.6 (60.1)	15.7 (60.3)	15.1 (59.2)	11.1 (52.0)	8.7 (47.7)	8.0 (46.4)	12.4 (54.3)
Average precipitation mm (inches)	12.4 (0.49)	21.5 (0.85)	50.1 (1.97)	106.3 (4.19)	77.7 (3.06)	32.9 (1.30)	60.2 (2.37)	85.5 (3.37)	88.0 (3.46)	39.4 (1.55)	18.1 (0.71)	10.1 (0.40)	602.2 (23.72)
Average relative humidity (%)	49	47	52	62	63	65	64	64	63	58	50	50	57
Source 1: Ethiopian Meteorological Institute
Source 2: FAO (humidity)

== Ecology ==
The vegetation is a grassland from the east and south of the city towards wajaale, with Pockets of juipars and gum forest in higher altitudes in the northern and western part of the city, there is extensive history of animal life in the past. For example, the area was earlier a habitat for the African wild dog, Lycaon pictus, although this canid is likely extirpated at present in the local area, due to an expanding human population.

In his memoirs of his homeland, Nega Mezlekia describes Jijiga as sitting "on the edge of a vast, unmitigated valley on the bottom of Mount Kramanda the beginning of the mighty Ethiopian highlands, with vast lush greenery in sight, rolling hills and plains dotted with many farms in all directions the soaring Eastern Ethiopian Highlands slowly climbing west, the very common tall grassland tree used as shelter by the wandering hyena, and the inevitable sacred tree in every compound, trees in this area of the Somali region reach great heights with the help of generous rainfall year-round, the native Somalis in the area would use this area as a dry season grazing land for all the noble tribes of the land. The city is surrounded by rocky tall green mountains on all sides save the north all the way past nearby Harar all the way to Addis, which is open as far as the eye can see."

== Sites ==
Numerous locations in proximity to Jijiga possess tourism potential, including a cave that was historically utilized by Garad Wiil Waal and a mosque that originates from 1315 during the Harla Kingdom. The area around Jijiga also features scenic views counting the Hamran Mountain in Awbare district.

== Notable people ==
- Hinda Abdi Mohamoud, journalist

== Notes ==
=== Bibliography ===
- Drysdale, John (1964). The Somali Dispute. New York: Frederick A. Praeger Inc. LCCN 64-13122. OCLC 467147.
- FitzGibbon, Louis (1985). The Evaded Duty. London: Rex Collings. ISBN 0860362094. OCLC 15018961.
