= Marehan =

Somali Darod Clan

Marehan مريحان
- Darod Somali Clan
- Ethnicity: (Somalia) Somali
- Location: (Somalia) Somalia (Ethiopia) Ethiopia; Yemen
- Descended from: Abdirahman bin Isma'il al-Jabarti
- Parent tribe: Sade
- Language: (Somalia) Somali (Arab League) Arabic
- Religion: Sunni Islam

The Marehan (Somali: Mareexaan, Arabic: مريحان) is a Somali clan, which is part of one of the largest Somali clan families, the Darod.

== Overview ==
Between the 17th and 18th centuries, the Marehan were reported to have lived in an area that extended from the Bandar Siyada on the Gulf of Aden to beyond Ras el-Khail on the Indian Ocean, or much of northern Somalia. The clan are recorded as having played a significant role in Imam Ahmad ibn Ibrihim al-Ghazi's campaigns against Ethiopia during the 16th century. The commander of the Somali forces and the closest deputy of the Imam was a Marehan commander, Garad Hirabu Goita Tedros. Ahmad ibn Ibrihim al-Ghazi was also a member of the clan, and his descendants can be found in Gedo Somalia and are part of the Reer Garaad sub clans. His descendants in Amhara and Gurage also claim descent from the tribe. Together they helped push westward the enemies into the plains of Harar and farther, helping destabilize the highland Christian empire. Evident in these battles were the Somali archers, namely the Marehan and the Gerri archers, through whom al-Ghazi was able to defeat the numerically superior Ethiopian Army that consisted of 16,000 cavalry and more than 200,000 infantry. After the fall of the Sultanate, the tribe would go on to rule the Imamate of Aussa

Another major ruler was Emir Nur ibn Mujahid who was the second conqueror of Ethiopia, he was the commander of the elite Melesay unit, and he would capture the southeastern provinces of Ethiopia. He successfully defeated the forces of Gelawdewos and killed him in the battle of Fatagar. He also built the walls of Harar spanning a whooping 3.9 km, a UNESCO world heritage site, and the longest fortified walls in east Africa. His son aided Talha ibn Abbas, the son of Wazir Abbas in his war against the grand sons of Uthman the Abyssinian and his sub clan would go on to rule the Emirate of Harar.

=== Garad Hirabu Goita Tedros ===
Marehan had multiple powerful important leaders within the Adal such as Garad Hirabu, who was given the title Emir of the Somalis. During the Adal war there were 3 generals who were Ahmad ibn Ibrahim al-Ghazi, Garad Hirabu Goita Tedros and Sultan Muhammad.

Garad Hirabu would save the Imam from Sultan Abu Bakr ibn Muhammad, the arch rival of the Abadir dynasty who had killed the cousin of Garad Hirabu and Ahmad ibn Ibrahim al-Ghazi, Abun Adashe. Abu Bakr ibn Muhammad in revenge for the take over of the Adal Sultanate by the Abadir dynasty would attempt to stage a coup and kill the Imam, however he was halted by the Emir Garad Hirabu Goita Tedros.

He was the son of Goyta Ali (Tedros, a title given by the local Harla) which is the highest role in the sultanate, his father controlled all trading routes in the kingdom and held the keys to the gates of Harar during nocturnal periods, the title Goyta was third only to Emir and Sultan and was the title of the highest general. Garad Hirabu Goita Tedros successfully captured the provinces of Bale and Tigray.

== Groups ==
The Juba Valley Alliance is a political faction of the Somali Civil War.

The Somali Revolutionary Socialist Party was the ruling party of the Somali Democratic Republic from 1976 to 1991.

The Somali National Front (SNF) was also a revolutionary movement and armed militia in Somalia after the Somali Democratic Republic collapsed.

== Notable people ==
- Mohamed Omar Salihi, Was a marine scientist, engineer, and maritime advisor to the Somali presidency credited for the protection of Somalia's maritime database during the civil war that broke in 1991.
- Abdiweli Sheikh Ahmed, 17th Prime Minister of Somalia, Economist and Politician.
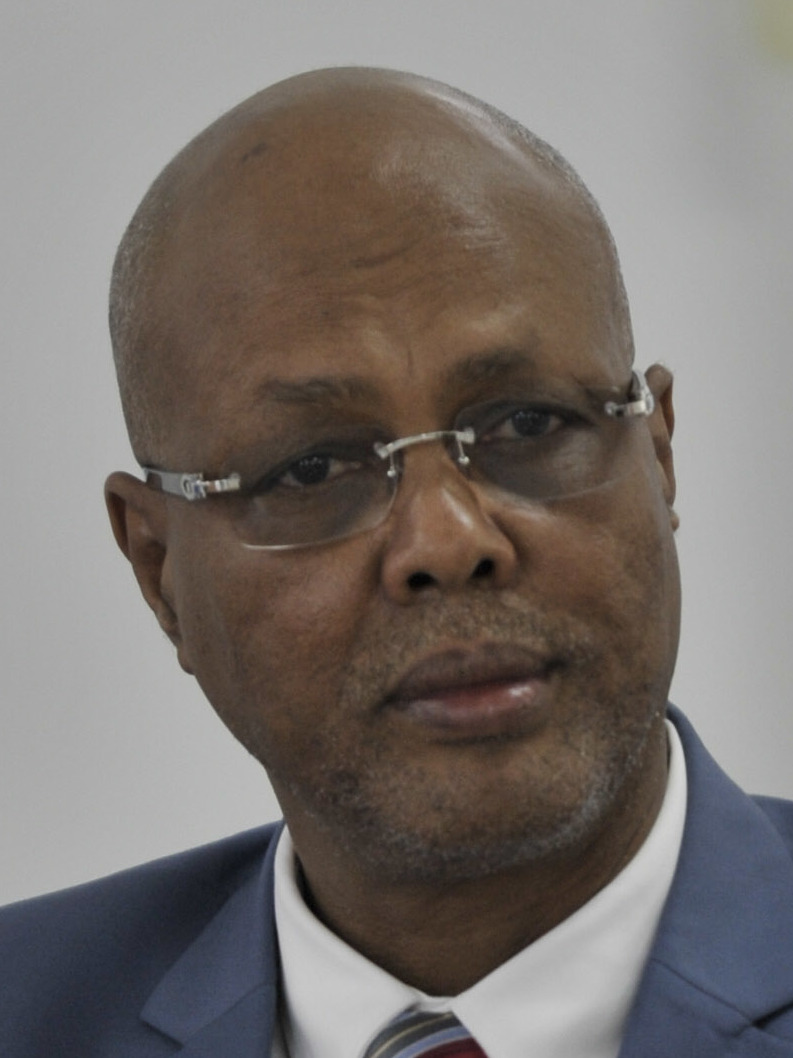
  Abdiweli Sheikh Ahmed, 17th Prime Minister of Somalia.
- senator《 mowlid hussein guhad 》

deputy speaker of Somali's Upper House. 2017 - 2022

- Muhammad Gasa (Arabic: محمد قاسا) (died 1583)- First Imam of the Aussa Imamate and relative of Nur ibn Mujahid and Ahmed Al-Ghazi.
- Mohamed Abdullahi Farmaajo, 9th President of Somalia, Founder Nabad iyo Nolol party

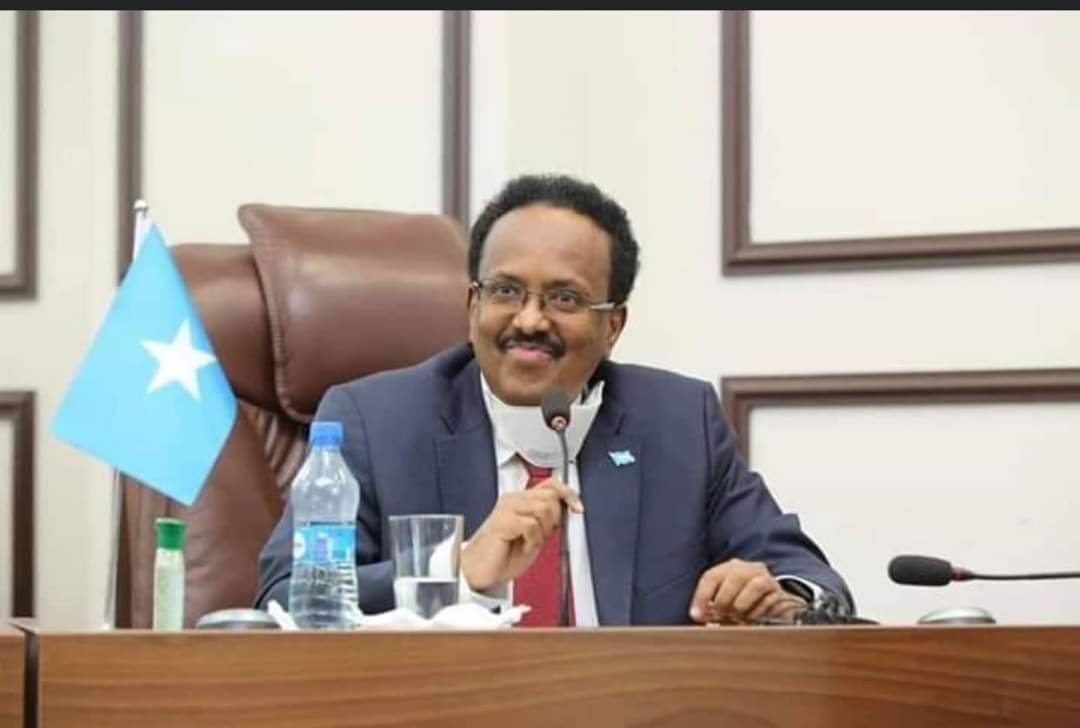
Mohamed Abdullahi Farmaajo, 9th President of Somalia.

- Mohamed Siad Barre, Former President of Somali Democratic Republic.

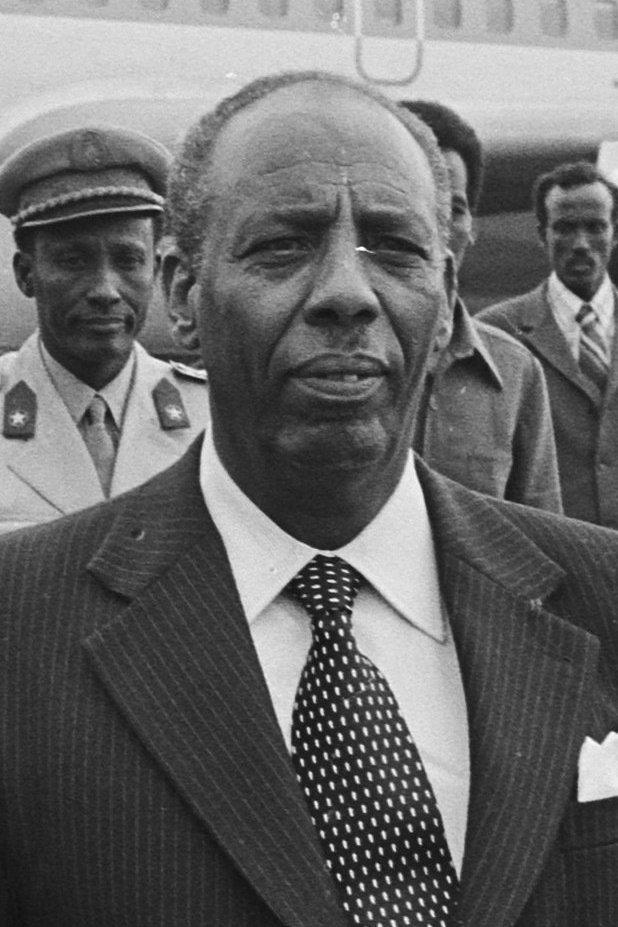
Mohamed Siad Barre, Former President of Somalia.

- Mohamed Mohamoud Warsame (Jango’an) Former interior Minister of Somalia.
- Abdiweli Sheikh Ahmed, Former Prime minister of Somalia.
- Mohamud Ali Magan, Former Minister of Planning, Former Consul General to United States Of America and Canada.
- Abdi Farah Shirdon, Former Prime Minister of Somalia.
- Mohamed Ali, Is director for the Kismayo Regional Islamic Courts under the government of the Juba Valley Alliance.
- Abdiwahid Gonjeh, Former Prime Minister of Somalia.
- Abdirahman Jama Barre, The first Deputy Prime Minister.
- Shire Jama Ahmed, a linguist who implemented the modern Somali Latin script.
- General Yusuf Osman Dhumal, a former Head Commander of Somali Military Forces.
- Farah Hussein Sharmarke, a philosopher and poet.
- Omar Haji Massale, Former Minister of Defence and Health of Somalia
- Ahmed Abdullahi Gulleid, A columnist, writer and researcher.
- Mohamed Hashi Abdi, Former Vice President of the Galmudug State.
- Dr. Mohamed Said Samatar, Somali Architects and Strategist Designer, Founder of the Somali National Front.
- Emir Nur ibn Mujahid, the second conqueror of Adal Sultanate [Reign 1550–1567] After Imam Ahmed Gurey Ethiopia and the Patron Saint of Harar was one of rulers of parts of the Horn of Africa.
- Fatimo Isaak Bihi, First Somali female Ambassador to Geneva, Director of the African Department of the Ministry of Foreign Affairs.
- Khalif Farah Hayir, a poet who mainly creates patriotic poems as well as poems that address Somali social issues.
- Ahmed Warsame, Former Head of the Somali Military Academy.
- Aden Ibrahim Aw Hirsi, An author and politician – helped with planning of the Jubaland State and the current Minister of State for Environment & Climate Change of Somalia.
- Abdullahi Anod, Former Head Commander of the Somali Military Forces.
- Colonel Barre Adan Shire Hiiraale, Former Minister of Defence of Somalia, head of the Jubba Valley Alliance.
- Abdulkadir Sheikh Dini, Former Minister of Defence of Somalia.
- Abdi Shire Warsame, Former Somali Ambassador to Kenya and China and a former Foreign Affairs State Minister in the Transitional National Government.
- Abdulahi Sheik Ismael Fara-Tag, Member of sen of upper house in Somalia, Former Vice President Of Jubaland State of Somalia Former head of the Juba Valley Alliance.
- Ahmed Mohamed Hassan, A member of the Pan-African Parliament.
- General Dr. Ali Nur.
- General Mohammed Hashi ''Gaani'', a former Head Commander of the Somali Military Forces as well as being the former head of the SNF.
- Garad Hirabu Goita Tedros.
- Ahmed 'Idaaja'' Farah Ali, a Somali literary scholar and publisher of written folklore.
- Mohamed Aden Sheikh, Premier Somali intellectual, Former head of Somali Technological Development, Medical doctor and Former Ministry of Health, Education and Information, Former Head of the Ideology Bureau SRRC.
- Abdulkadir 'Yamyam'' Hersi Siyad was a Somali poet and playwright.
- Ali Matan Hashi, First Somali pilot and Commander of the Somali Air Force between 1959 and 1978.

== Sources ==
- Encyclopedia of Religion and Ethics Part 12. p. 490. ISBN 0-7661-3687-6.
- Pankhurst, Richard (2003). FUTUH UL HABSHAH OR THE CONQUEST OF ABYSSINIA. Tsehai Publishers & Distributors. p. 37. ISBN 978-0-9723172-5-2.
