= Garad Hirabu Goita Tedros Al Somali =

Grand General and Emir of the Somalis Goita Hirabu Goita Tedros جاراد هيرابو جويتا علي
- Garad Hirabu
- Born: Hirabu; 1478 Harar
- Burial place: Unknown
- Relatives: Ali Goita, Ahmad ibn Ibrahim al-Ghazi, Nur ibn Mujahid
- Military career
- Allegiance: Adal Sultanate
- Branch: Somali forces
- Rank: Grand General, Emir of the Somalis
- Known for: Ethiopian-Adal war
- Conflicts: Badeqe, Battle of Shimbra Kure, Battle of Amba Sel, Battle of Zari

Goita Hirabu Goita Ali, widely known as Garad Hirabu, was a Somali military commander and general that served the Adal Sultanate. He held a significant position as one of the more notable generals within the historical tapestry of the Adal Sultanate. Acting as the commander of the Somali forces, he steered one of the three fronts during the ambitious conquest of Abyssinia. He was also a cousin of Imam Ahmed, who he was a close confidant of.

His significance in the conquest included both his rise to power and his subjugation of the provinces of Wollo and Bale, a feat chronicled in a work by Shihab al-Dīn Aḥmad ibn ʿAbd al-Qādir ibn Sālim ibn ʿUthmān. Hailing from the Marehan clan of Garad Hirabu Goita, Ali played a role in thwarting a coup orchestrated by the rival Sultan Abu Bakr. In a consequential turn of events, he not only eliminated Abu Bakr but also avenged their close cousin Garad Abun Adashe, subsequently installing Abu Bakr's cousin Umar Din as a figurehead. Garad Hirabu Goita Ali also quashed potential insurrections from the Walashma dynasty and orchestrated the demise of another of their aspiring Sultans who attempted a coup against Ahmad ibn Ibrahim al-Ghazi.

== Conquests And Background ==
Born into the Marehan clan, specifically the Reer Garad sub-clan of the Rida-Amir, Garad Hirabu Goita Tedros emerged as a significant figure in the Abyssinian conquest. Holding the position of Garad within the Imam's clan, he also assumed the mantle of Emir over the entirety of the Somali forces. His lineage as the son of a Goita endowed him with significant authority. As the traditional leader of the Marehan, Garad Hirabu Goita Ali wielded considerable influence as a commander and an ally to his cousin Abun Adashe. He later orchestrated a retribution campaign alongside the Imam to avenge the grievances suffered by Abun Adashe. Garad Hirabu Goita eventually led one of the triumvirate armies that embarked on the conquest of Abyssinia. He would later be made the Prince of Dawaro towards the end of the conquest.

== The Assassination of Umar Din's son ==
During the later early years of the conquest puppet Sultan Umar Din had hatched a plan together with top generals from the army of the Adal Sultanate to recapture the kingdom in order to reinstall Walashma power. For years prior there was consistent conflict between the Emirs and the Sultans battling over control of the kingdom, the Emirs hailing from the Abadir sub clan of the Marehan and the Sultans hailing from the Walashma. The animosity between the two dynasties was heightened when Abun Adashe was killed by Sultan Abu Bakr and he, the father brother of Umar Din was killed in revenge. This in turn lead to a coup attempt by the dynasty and their sympathizers.

Prior to the conquest, it was also Hirabu who successfully defeated Sultan Abu Bakr, permitting the Imam to initiate the conquest.

Umar Din along with Wazir Nur and Garad Akmoscia had initiated a plan with the aim of killing the Imam and making Umar Din ruler. Qadi Abu Bakr hearing this, travelled to Zerba where the Imam stayed and told him everything, the Imam responded, he was ready to cede the country to them, however Emir Hussein Al Gaturi and numerous others were strongly opposed to this, and told him to hire an army composed of the Somalis to end their plans. In the meantime, the cousin of the Imam, Hirabu had already killed the son of Umar Din who had joined his father in the plot attempts and he sent a letter to the Imam asking for help, begging and exclaiming how Hirabu would kill him as well if he was not stopped. The Imam wanting to maintain law and order within the kingdom accepted his repeated apologies, and let his cousin go to the capital of the Marehan country in Kidad, pretending to hide to ensure there was law and order in the country, he later fled to hide in Hawiye country.

Translation of the passage: Page 32

"In the land of saad-Eddin, who would take the tribute and distribute it to the poor; at the same time to inform him of the victories won, of the great booty made, and of the many riches he had at his disposal to purchase weapons. All the leaders obeyed the Iman without exception, who sent his troops to their homes to rest and prepare for new wars. The Iman went to the town of Zerba to settle some issues that had arisen between the leaders. But in the meantime a certain Omardin, Vizir Nur and Gherad Akmoscia together with other leaders had hatched a conspiracy with the aim of taking possession of the Iman, which at that moment was left with very few soldiers. And they had already managed to take the Iman's horses, which he had left in the custody of his servants, and also his weapons. Kadi Abubeker protested this infamous act, but was unable to overcome the resistance of those leaders to carry out their intentions against the Iman. Then Kadi Abubeker immediately went to Zerba to tell everything to the Iman. To which I announced the Iman told him to go back that if those leaders persisted in the idea of war against him and in their hostile intentions against him, he was ready to cede the country to them. But Emir Ussein el Gaturi, hearing this speech, broke down and said to the Iman: "How do you want to give up your country to them? instead we will try to gather as many Somali soldiers as possible and we will wage war." All the other leaders stood up and supported what Emir Ussein el Gaturi had proposed. The Iman left Zerba and walked for 4 days to reach the town called Ianaser, which was close to the sultan's residence: he left from that place and reached the town of Ualakam, where he found a very large quantity of Ciat. When the Sultan learned that I'Iman was approaching with a good number of soldiers, he then repeatedly sent for his In the meantime Erabo, leader of the Somali Merrean tribe he had killed the son of Sultan Omardin, who had joined the conspiracy. And Sultan Omardin complained to the Iman and said: "Erabo has killed my son and perhaps he still thinks of doing me more harm. The Iman then together with Sultan Omardin pushed into Somali territory as far as Godat: Erabo fled and the Iman with Omardin."
