= Adalite Civil War =

1520–1526 war between Adal Sultanate and Walashma dynasty

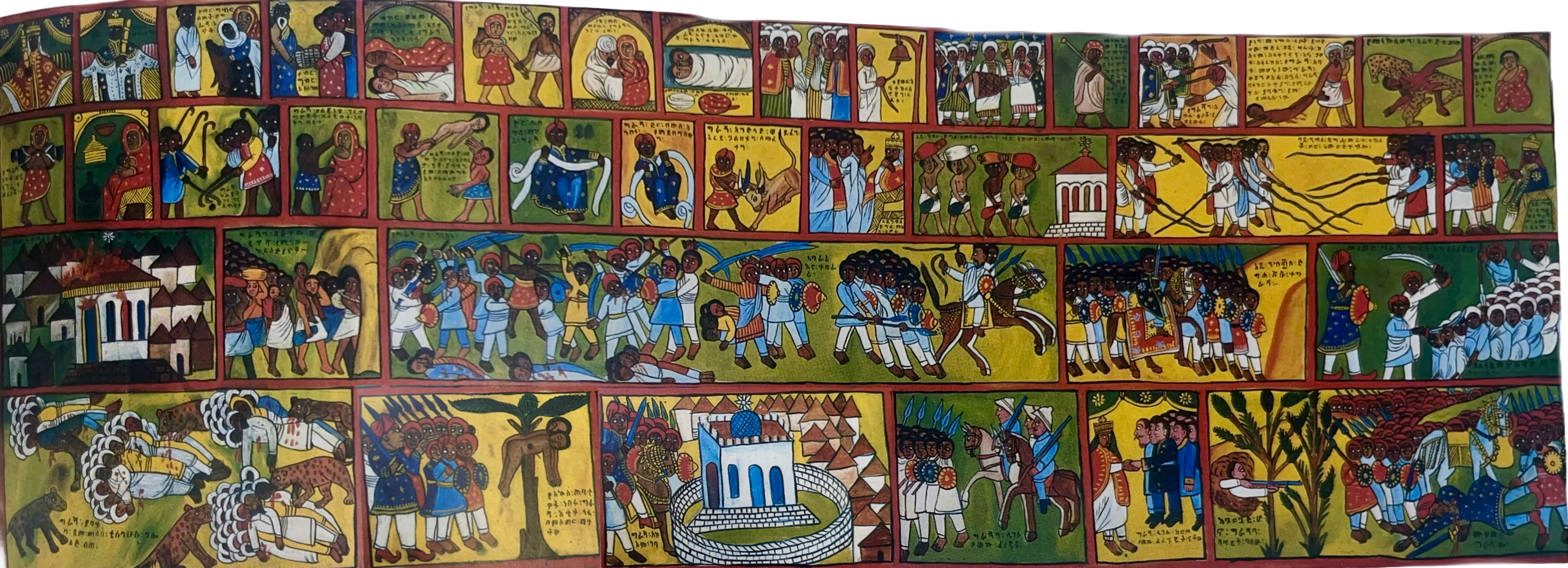
- A traditional painting titled 'Life of Gragn' by an anonymous Ethiopian painter
Date	1518–1526
Location	Adal Sultanate
Result	Rebel victory: Deposition of the Walashma Dynasty

Belligerents
Hubat rebels	Walashma Dynasty

Commanders and leaders
Garad Abogn ibn Adish †; Ahmed ibn Ibrahim Al-Ghazi (WIA)	Sultan Abu Bakr ibn Muhammad †

Strength
Harla militia	Mainly Somali brigands

The Adalite Civil War (1518–1526) was an eight-year-long internal conflict within the Adal Sultanate between the Walashma dynasty and the forces of Garad Abogn ibn Adish. The war ultimately led to the rise of Ahmad ibn Ibrahim al-Ghazi, who later launched the Conquest of Abyssinia (Futūḥ Al-Ḥabaša).

== Background ==
After 1468, dissident leaders in Adal opposed Sultan Muhammad ibn Badlay’s rule for signing a treaty with Emperor Baeda Maryam of Ethiopia, which required Adal to pay yearly tribute. Provincial emirs viewed this as a betrayal of their independence and resistance to Abyssinian control. The emir of Zeila, the wealthiest province and main opponent, was particularly burdened by the tribute. In 1471, Emir Laday Usman seized power in Dakkar but allowed the sultan to remain as a figurehead, holding real authority himself and marking a shift in Adal’s leadership to a powerful emirate under a nominal sultan. Laday Usman resumed hostilities, marking the resumption of conflicts with Adal, which, after an initial success in which Usman routed Emperor Baede Maryam’s troops in battle, ultimately ended with the defeat of Baede Maryam’s armies. Although he was later beaten by Emperor Eskender. Historian Mohammed Hassen notes that the Sultans of Adal had lost control of the state to Harar's aristocracy.

Afterwards, Imam Mahfuz became the governor of Zeila, a city on the Somali coast. By the 1480s, he had risen to dominate Adal’s politics and was awarded multiple titles. Unlike Sultan Muhammad ibn Azhar ad-Din and his moderate faction, who favored coexistence with the Ethiopian Empire, Mahfuz preferred continued conflict. He sought to extend his influence over the Muslim border provinces of Ifat, Fatagar, Dawaro, and Bale. Mahfuz also successfully led military expeditions deep into Abyssinia’s heartland, including Shewa, an achievement that previous Adal sultans had failed to accomplish. According to Alvarez, when Emperor Lebna Dengel reached adulthood, he defied his counselors and people by abandoning his observance of Lent to confront Imam Mahfuz in battle. After learning through spies that the Imam was in Fatagar, Lebna Dengel led his army there and found Mahfuz and the Sultan of Adal encamped on a mountain-surrounded plain. While Mahfuz managed to help the Sultan escape with only four horsemen, he realized he was trapped and chose to die honorably, challenging the Abyssinians to single combat. Gabra Endreyas, a former follower of the Emperor’s father, accepted the challenge and killed Mahfuz with a two-handed sword, cleaving him from the lower neck to the shoulder. Mahfuz’s head was then displayed in the Emperor’s court, where Gabra proclaimed, “There is the Goliath of the Infidels.” Following his victory, Lebna Dengel adopted the appellation Wanag Segad, a title combining Ge’ez and Harari terms. His death led to a power struggle between the radical and moderate factions in Adal with the followers of Mahfuz essentially prevailing.

== Conflict ==
According to the chronicler Arab Faqih, during and after the thirty-year reign of Sultan Muhammad ibn Azhar ad-Din, who led an unsuccessful campaign in Abyssinia. The Adal Sultanate underwent a series of coups. The sultan was killed in 1518 by his son-in-law, Muhammad bin Abu Bakr bin Mahfuz, who ruled for one year before being assassinated by Ibrahim bin Ahmad of Hubat. Ibrahim ruled for three months before being murdered by Wasani, a slave of Garad Mahfuz. Wasani was later captured and murdered by a slave owned by Yafa in Zeila. Power then passed to Emir Mansur bin Mahfuz bin Muhammad bin Garad Adas, who ruled briefly and fought Garad Abun for five months. Garad Abun defeated him and ruled for seven years, restoring order, enforcing Islamic law, and strengthening governance and religious institutions. Garad Abun Adashe emerged as the most powerful figure in Adal, creating tensions with the ruling Walashma dynasty. Among his supporters was Ahmad ibn Ibrahim al-Ghazi, a military commander from Hubat who quickly gained recognition for his leadership skills. Garad Abun, impressed by Ahmad's valor, arranged for him to marry Bati del Wambara, the daughter of the late Mahfuz. Arab Faqih mentions that, Sultan Abu Bakr ibn Muhammad of the Walashma dynasty, fearing Adashe's influence, established his capital at Harar and mobilized a large army, primarily composed of Somali highwaymen and attacked the Hubat state. In 1525, Abu Bakr's forces confronted and killed Abun Adashe near Zeila.

Ahmad bin Ibrahim learned that Fanuel, a Christian Abyssinian noble, had invaded Muslim lands in Hubat, plundering villages, enslaving families, and seizing livestock. In response, Imam Ahmad gathered his forces and marched to confront the enemy near a river called Aqam. A fierce battle followed, filled with dust and the clash of swords, as Imam Ahmad led a decisive assault that broke the enemy’s ranks. Despite a strong counterattack by Fanuel and his armored companions, the Muslims fought bravely and defeated them, killing many soldiers and nobles. They captured numerous horses, weapons, and supplies, freed Muslim captives, and recovered the stolen livestock. Victorious and unharmed, the Muslims returned joyfully to the town of Zifah near the territory of Sultan Abu Bakr bin Muhammad. When the sultan and the Somalis who were with him heard about the Muslims’ victory in the jihad against the infidels and the great booty they had taken, they were filled with fear and anxiety. Terrified by the news, the sultan and his Somali followers fled the country and took refuge in a town called Kidad in the land of Somalis.

When Emperor Dawit II of Ethiopia heard that a rebel named Ahmad ibn Ibrahim was engaged in a power struggle with the Adal leaders, he dispatched his general Degelhan to confront him. At first, the Abyssinian campaign appeared successful, as Degelhan captured many women and children from Adal, including the mother of Ahmad’s commander, Abu Bakr Qecchin. Meanwhile, Ahmad ibn Ibrahim al-Ghazi prepared an ambush in Hubat. Dividing his force into three groups, he waited for the Abyssinians to enter the region after they had plundered Harar, and then struck them in the Battle of Hubat. The remaining Abyssinian soldiers who were not killed fled in panic, giving Ahmad’s troops a decisive victory and allowing them to recover the stolen goods. Ahmad’s triumph not only strengthened his military power but also spread his reputation widely. On hearing of this, the Sultan assembled a large number of his Somali followers and laid siege to Ahmad’s capital during the siege of Hubat. Ahmad, who was unprepared, withdrew with a small force to a mountain camp on Gara Muleta. The Sultan besieged him for ten days, intending to starve him into submission. During the siege, the Hubat leader Garad Umar Din was killed. However, at this critical point, the sheikhs of Harar intervened and mediated between the two sides. Ahmad was then compelled to acknowledge the authority of the Adalite state for the first time in his career.

This peace was soon broken by Abu Bakr, who attempted to assassinate Ahmad while he was in Harar. Ahmad escaped to Hubat, where he continued his struggle against the Sultan. Around this time, a swarm of bees settled upon Ahmad’s head, an event considered so miraculous that people bestowed upon him the title of Imam. After a series of battles, the Imam defeated and killed Abu Bakr, who had fled to the Ogaden among his Somali supporters. Ahmad then returned to Harar and installed Umar Din on the throne as his puppet ruler. Over the following months, the Imam worked to subdue the surrounding Somali clans through both diplomacy and warfare.

== Aftermath ==
Ahmad's aim was to unite the various Muslim nomadic groups under his authority, a goal he achieved with great success. The Imam also began to amass firearms, including matchlock muskets, cannons, and arquebuses, which he obtained from Arabia through the port of Zeila. Before launching his invasion of Ethiopia, he is said to have acquired several cannons and well-armed soldiers from Yemen through his connections with the Ba 'Alawiyya. He invited the Somali chiefs of the region to join his jihad, or holy war, against Ethiopia. In addition to the Somalis, Ahmad’s army included other groups who had long been in conflict with the Christian empire since the fourteenth century, such as the Harla, Argobba, Afar, and Arabs. By around 1527 to 1529, the Imam commanded a powerful state with a rapidly expanding sphere of influence in the interior of the Horn of Africa, and he was prepared to lead a decisive military campaign against the Christian empire. Ahmed would go onto unify Muslims in the region and prepare for the conquest of Abyssinia.
