= Battle of Fatagar (1516) =

Battle between the Ethiopian Empire and Adal Sultanate, 1516 or 1517

| Date | 1516 or July 1517 (disputed; see below) |
| Location | Fatagar, Ethiopian Empire |
| Result | Ethiopian victory |

Belligerents
| Ethiopian Empire | Adal Sultanate |

Commanders and leaders
| Lebna Dengel; Gabra Endreyas | Mahfuz †; Muhammad ibn Azhar ad-Din (AWOL) |

Strength
| Unknown | Unknown |

Casualties and losses
| Unknown | Heavy; the army's commander killed |

The Battle of Fatagar was fought in either 1516 or 1517 (Note: The date is disputed; see #Dating.), between the Ethiopian Empire under Emperor Lebna Dengel and troops of the Adal Sultanate led by Mahfuz, on the frontier of the Ethiopian province of Fatagar. The battle ended in a decisive Ethiopian victory. According to the Portuguese chaplain Francisco Álvares, Mahfuz, who had raided Ethiopian territory every Lent for some twenty-five years, was killed after he challenged the Ethiopians to single combat and a monk named Gabra Endreyas answered the challenge. Adal's ruler, Sultan Muhammad, managed to escape the battlefield. Following the battle, Lebna Dengel raided Adal itself, and Muhammad was murdered after returning home, after which the sultanate passed through a period of dynastic instability.

The battle is known mainly from two largely independent accounts: that of Álvares, who was in Ethiopia with a Portuguese embassy from 1520 to 1526 and recorded what he was told by others, and a short passage in the introductory chapter of the chronicle of Sarsa Dengel. Muslim sources say almost nothing about it. Modern historians disagree about its date and about whether the Adalite army was led by Mahfuz acting largely on his own or by the sultan with Mahfuz as his commander.

== Background ==
=== Fatagar and the frontier ===
Fatagar (also spelled Fatigar or Fatajar) lay on the south-eastern edge of the Ethiopian highlands, north of Dawaro and bordering the territory of Adal. One of the three main routes from the plateau towards the port of Zeila ran through it. It was one of the eastern regions taken from the Muslims by the Solomonic kings, who used it as a base: Emperor Dawit established the royal camp at Yalabasha in Fatagar, Zar'a Ya'eqob and Eskender were born there, and Zar'a Ya'eqob founded two royal churches in the province. Eskender was crowned at Yalabasha.

The defense of the province was solely based on one governor. As mentioned in Taddesse Tamrat, the governor Amda Mika’el, who was appointed by Zar’a Ya’eqob, enjoyed a good, united command until his fall from power in about 1485. After he fell from power, the province was divided among lower rank officials. The *Futūḥ al-Ḥabaša* says that the province was divided into seven commands and even Pankhurst states that Lebna Dengel later divided it into seven Christian chiefs. This is regarded as one of the weaknesses of the defense of the frontier as noted by Taddesse. (Note: According to Beckingham and Huntingford's notes on Álvares, Fatagar was among the Muslim states of the area, considered a province of the Ethiopian kingdom and nominally tributary to it. The others, including Taddesse Tamrat, Pankhurst, Derat, and Deresse Ayenachew, consider Fatagar to be a border province controlled militarily by Christians since the time of Dawit.) The author Álvares who travelled in the province with the imperial court describes it as a land of plains and low hills growing wheat and barley, with many churches and monasteries, and a large hill that Beckingham and Huntingford identify as Mount Zuqualla.

The Futūḥ also corroborates the "seven commands" claim above in its own words: it says that in the previous reign, Fatagar had a single Ethiopian baṭrīq (military governor) in overall command, and that Lebna Dengel appointed seven who competed with each other, of whom the text names only one, Islamu, as "governor". (Note: It is the same episode as Taddesse Tamrat's account, above, of Amda Mika'el's fall from power around 1485 and the resulting fragmentation into several commands: Taddesse Tamrat's own text cites this same passage of the Futūḥ al-Ḥabaša, translated by Basset: "In the reign of the grandfather of the king of Ethiopia there was only one governor in Fāṭagar who was the chief commander [of the Christian forces there]," and goes on to say that "in Libnä-Dingil's [Lebna Dengel's] time... the province of Fāṭagar was divided into seven different commands.")

=== Adal and Mahfuz ===
The Walasma' dynasty returned from exile in Yemen in 1415 and re-established itself in Adal, with its capital at Dakar near Harar. Emperor Eskender had attacked and destroyed Dakar around 1480. Muhammad ibn Azhar ad-Din became sultan in March 1488. Older scholarship generally portrays him as a ruler who preferred peace with the Christians, and Mahfuz as the leader of a more militant faction.. According to Pankhurst, Emperor Ba'eda Maryam's marriage to Eleni, daughter of the Hadiya ruler Mehmäd, was likely intended to break the existing Hadiya-Adal axis, which had already posed a threat to the empire.

According to Álvares, who was told the story chiefly by Pero da Covilhã and other informants, Mahfuz invaded Ethiopian territory every Lent for about twenty-five years, beginning under Emperor Eskender and continuing under Na'od and into the early years of Lebna Dengel. Lent, when the fast weakened the Christians, was his preferred season. In one raid he is said to have carried off nineteen thousand captives, who were sent as gifts to rulers in Arabia. On his twenty-fourth expedition he entered Fatagar. The population fled to a large hill, but Mahfuz followed them and burned the churches and monasteries. He then separated the peasants, whom he told to go home and sow for the next year so that his army could feed itself when it returned, from the professional soldiers (chäwa), who were put to the sword. (Note: The number of men-at-arms executed is given in Beckingham and Huntingford's translation as "fifteen," while their note reports that Ramusio's version gives the figure, in words, as 5,000. Pankhurst reads it as 15,000.) Mahfuz is reported to have caused the deaths of Ethiopian Emperors Na'od and Eskender. The British explorer, Richard Burton asserted that Mahfuz had offered a bribe to one of Emperor Eskender's escorts in order to orchestrate the emperor's murder.

Older literature calls Mahfuz an "imam" and governor of Zeila as well as leader of Harar, and Kropp's notes to the Ethiopian chronicle likewise describe him as governor of Zeila. Chekroun points out that none of the primary sources gives him either title: the Futūḥ al-Ḥabaša calls him an emir or garād, and the Ethiopian and Portuguese texts call him a vizier or captain. (Note: Chekroun (2023), however, suggests that the filiation often attributed to Mahfuz (as a son of a "Muhammad") is a modern invention unsupported by any source, arising from a confusion in Álvares's own narrative between "Mafudi" (a rendering of Mahfuz's name) and "Mafamede" (which she reads as a garbled rendering of "Muhammad"). She also notes that the Futūḥ al-Ḥabaša mentions the rule of an "emir Manṣūr b. Maḥfūẓ b. Muḥammad b. jarād Adash" before jarād Abūn; this Mahfuz does descend from a Muhammad, but there is no reason to think he is the same Mahfuz discussed in this article.) Bruce, an example of this older literature, states that the Sherif of Mecca rewarded Mahfuz's raids with a green silk standard and a black velvet tent embroidered with gold, and made him shaykh of Zeila.

=== Ethiopia under Lebna Dengel ===
Lebna Dengel had come to the throne in 1508, aged about twelve, and the kingdom was governed by a regency headed by his mother, Na'od Mogasa, and Queen Eleni, with the advice of leading courtiers. The sources differ on his age at the time of the battle: Álvares gives seventeen, the Ethiopian chronicle twenty.

The frontier had gone badly in the preceding years. Taddesse Tamrat writes that under Na'od Muslim attacks on the frontier districts of Ifat and Fatagar increased and that defections from the frontier troops were frequent. The first years of Lebna Dengel's reign brought continuous Muslim successes on the eastern frontier, and even the official chronicles report no Christian victory until he had been on the throne for eight years.

== Prelude ==
According to Álvares, Lebna Dengel had sent spies into Adal to find out where Mahfuz wanted to strike next. They reported that the sultan himself was coming with Mahfuz and a large force, that the army had already entered Fatagar and begun destroying the newly grown crops, and that it planned to raid elsewhere once Lent began. The emperor's advisers said that Lebna Dengel was still too young to fight in the field and that his regional commanders could deal with the invaders. He refused to listen to their advice and insisted on going to the battlefield in person, to avenge the wrongs done to himself, his father, and his uncle Eskender. To avoid warning the enemy, he set out without calling up troops from distant provinces and marched day and night.

His camp was pitched at dawn close to the first market town of Adal. The Muslim army had passed through a nearby pass the day before and was now only about half a league within the boundaries of Ethiopia, so the emperor's army was positioned along its line of retreat. The Ethiopian chronicle portrays this situation differently: there, the king of Adal marches against Lebna Dengel with a large army led by his vizier Mahfuz, and the emperor, on hearing of it, hurries to meet him.

Bruce's account, while based on Álvares, gives more detail about both the preparations and the ambush. According to Bruce, the empress disapproved of the king conducting the campaign in person, citing his inexperience in warfare, and urged him to delegate the task to more experienced officers. The king answered that every capable officer had already tried his skill against the Adalites and failed, so that the army had lost confidence in them, and that he was determined to put himself to the same test. On this occasion the army's willingness to fight was high, since the young nobility was glad to have a leader their own age, and the empress funded the campaign generously from her own treasury. As the army advanced through Fatagar towards Aussa, which Bruce takes to be the capital of Adal, (Note: Modern scholarship, however, places the Walasma' capital at Dakar until 1520 (see above).) the frontier force met a valley surrounded by mountains on every side except for two openings. The king divided the army into two parts, taking one part with himself and giving the bitwädäd the other to seal the second opening, so that the Muslim army, believing it had slipped past the Ethiopians unseen, had in fact marched into a trap.

== Battle ==
According to Álvares, both armies met at dawn. Upon recognizing the red tents, which only appeared during grand events, Mahfuz informed the sultan that the emperor was there in person and urged him to flee, since he himself was ready to stay and perish. The sultan then fled with four horsemen, one of whom was the son of an Ethiopian courtier of the rank of bitwädäd who had gone over to the Muslims. Bruce gives a different motive for the same escape: on his telling, Mahfuz had long believed a prophecy that he would die if he ever fought the Ethiopian king in person, and, once he recognised the king's scarlet tent among the enemy lines, took this as confirmation that his hour had come. It was Mahfuz, not fear on the sultan's part, who urged Muhammad, a ruler who Bruce describes as never fond of fighting, to slip away through a lesser mountain track with his household and a few friends, leaving Mahfuz in command. Being unaware of the retreat, Lebna Dengel ordered his troops to celebrate communion and eat before arranging them in ranks around the time of terce.

Mahfuz then came forward and asked whether any Christian knight would fight him to the death. However, according to Bruce, the challenge involved more detail: once satisfied the sultan had safely gotten away, Mahfuz sent a message to the Ethiopian camp offering single combat, on terms that, Bruce notes, were not certainly agreed, that whichever champion fell, his own army would withdraw without shedding further blood. A monk named Gabra Endreyas accepted the challenge, killed Mahfuz, and cut off his head. (Note: As explained by Beckingham and Huntingford, Gabra Endreyas ("servant of Andrew") was a soldier who had lost the tip of his tongue as punishment for treasonable speech and later became a monk. Other authors, including Bruce, call him Gabriel Andreas. Álvares met him at court and describes him as much honoured.) Bruce describes this monk as a man of great family, who had had part of his tongue cut out by Na'od for speaking too freely, but who was nonetheless the most learned man at court and, in strength and skill, unmatched by any soldier in the army; for this reason he asked the king's permission to fight the challenger himself, and received it amid the applause of the nobility. Of the killing blow, Bruce writes that Gabra Endreyas, "seeing his opportunity, with a two-handed sword struck [Mahfuz] between the lower part of the neck and the shoulder so violently, that he nearly divided his body into two, and felled him dead to the ground," then cut off the head and threw it at the king's feet, crying, "There is the Goliath of the Infidels."

The Ethiopians then began to attack. There was little chance of escape for the Muslims, as the emperor's camp held the main pass while the other pass was already filled with troops. Bruce had this cry serve as the signal for the general assault. Lebna Dengel's men drove the Muslims back onto the Bitwädäd's fresh forces, who forced them back again to the emperor, until, with no way out of the valley, the survivors scattered into the mountains, where they were hunted down by local peasants or left to die of thirst and starvation. Bruce puts Muslim losses at about twelve thousand against light Ethiopian casualties, and adds that the Prophet's green standard and the sultan's black velvet, gold tent were captured, along with a large amount of cattle and merchandise. The Ethiopian chronicle agrees that Mahfuz fell that day and that very few of his men escaped. It also reports that the emperor's troops killed many horsemen and shield bearers, spearmen, and that the fleeing sultan was, according to some, sighted by people of Dawaro who let him go home in peace, while others said they never saw him.

Later accounts add detail of uncertain reliability. Conti Rossini considered the roughly twelve-thousand figure given above by Bruce, and also found in Barros and other later writers, to be exaggerated. (Note: In Barros, as summarised by Beckingham and Huntingford, the Muslims are camped in a plain ringed by mountains, whose passes Lebna Dengel seized before attacking one morning; in this version a "Muhammad", described as captain of Zeila, advises flight, and the flight is made with only five horsemen.)

== Aftermath ==
=== Raid into Adal ===
According to Álvares, the day after the battle, Lebna Dengel traveled into Adal and reached a rich palace of the sultan, which he found abandoned. He struck the palace doors three times with his lance but would not let anyone else come closer, because he did not want people to say he had come to plunder. Then he left. Bruce's retelling of this event differs in a few details. Bruce places a royal palace a day's march from the battlefield, describes the king striking the palace's locked door only once with his lance, and has him leave the lance in the door instead of removing it, as proof that he had been there. The chronicle describes a harsher expedition that took place a few days after the victory: Lebna Dengel gathered his soldiers, marched into Adal, burned towns, and destroyed fortresses, and at a place called Zankar he tore down a tall royal castle and the mosque. No one dared to resist him, and he returned with many captives. (Note: Conti Rossini could not locate Zankar, which appears with the Somali and Adal in a hymn to Emperor Yeshaq; in the same note he observes that Dakar, then Adal's capital, lay south-east of Harar. Kropp suggests that Zankar may be a corrupted form of Dakkar (Dakar), whose royal residence Eskender had already destroyed some decades earlier.)

Pankhurst notes that Lebna Dengel still gained a great deal of loot, including the sultan's tent, which Álvares later saw, and several silver-hilted swords. Bruce writes that even though the king was welcomed home as "the deliverer of his country," people's attention on the return journey was mostly on Gabra Endreyas: his path was covered in flowers and branches, people sang his praises, placed garlands on him, and held up their children to get a look at him. Mahfuz's head was displayed at the emperor's court for years afterward, and Álvares says that "On Saturdays, Sundays, and holidays the common people made a sport of his head." Conti Rossini cautiously suggests that the title Wanag Sagad, which combines Harari and Ge'ez, was taken up after the victory over Adal; multiple commentators likewise describe it as a macaronic title adopted following the defeat of Adal's troops. Bruce, however, lists a name translated as Wanag Segued among the throne names Lebna Dengel took at his first coronation. This is corroborated by Markham, who records that Lebna Dengel (rendered "Ebana Denguel") ascended the throne in 1507 under the title Wanag Segued.

=== Death of Sultan Muhammad and the succession crisis ===
The Futūḥ al-Ḥabaša says that Sultan Muhammad led a jihad into the land of the Ḥabaša, that many Muslims were killed, and that Muhammad returned to Adal afterward and was murdered by his son-in-law, Muhammad b. Abī Bakr b. Maḥfūẓ. Wagner gives 1518 as the date of the murder and identifies the killer as a grandson of Mahfuz. The reason given is that Mahfuz's family feared losing their political influence once Muhammad was restored as a vassal of the Ethiopian emperor. Chekroun places Muhammad's death sometime between 1517 and 1519, noting that the 1518 date cannot be confirmed on its own and comes from the date Álvares gives for the battle. (Note: Kropp gives Muhammad's reign as 1487 to about 1518, saying he was reportedly murdered at Harar after his unsuccessful campaigns against Lebna Dengel. Wagner and Chekroun date his accession to 1488, while Chekroun places the sultan's capital at Dakar until 1520.)

There were five rulers mentioned in the Futūḥ, none from the Walasma' dynasty, who ruled one after another in quick succession: Muhammad b. Abī Bakr b. Maḥfūẓ, Ibrāhīm b. Aḥmad, Wasanī, Manṣūr b. Maḥfūẓ, and last but not least, garād Abūn, who ruled for several years. Chekroun does not consider the reign lengths reliable, yet she still sees the list as a sign of instability; Pankhurst notes the same rapid succession of power. As per the Futūḥ, Abūn was finally killed by Abū Bakr, a son of Muhammad ibn Azhar ad-Din. (Note: That Abū Bakr was a son of Muhammad ibn Azhar ad-Din is the genealogy of the Walasma' chronicle. According to Wagner, however, Azhar and Āzar are distinct names, and as ʿArabfaqīh's genealogy makes Abū Bakr a son of Muhammad b. Āzar, his accession marked the advent of a new branch of the dynasty to power. On this reading, the chronicle omits Muhammad b. Āzar, and ʿArabfaqīh credits him with the accomplishments of Muhammad ibn Azhar ad-Din. Chekroun (2023) rejects Wagner's attempt to reconcile the two genealogies as resting on "shaky arguments" and calls it "not very relevant" (peu pertinente). She sees the two texts as simply disagreeing on the name of Abū Bakr's father: the Futūḥ giving "Muhammad b. Āzar b. Abū Bakr" and the Walasma' chronicle and the Ta'rīkh al-mulūk giving "Muhammad b. Aẓhar ad-Dīn b. ʿAlī b. Abū Bakr", without inferring from this that two different men, or a shift of dynastic line, are involved.) The Walasma' Chronicle states that Abū Bakr founded the new capital, Harar, as a replacement for Dakar in July or August 1520. Wagner supports the same idea.

=== Longer-term significance ===
The historians interpret this battle differently. According to Pankhurst, it was a serious defeat of Adal. According to Abir, just like other victories of the Ethiopians, its consequences were transient since the disorder in Adal provided Ethiopia some respite. According to Deresse Ayenachew, Lebna Dengel prevented Mahfuz from attacking but could not bring Adal back into vassalage.

The Mahfuz family continued to be influential. His daughter, mentioned in the chronicle as Del Wambara, married future imam Ahmad ibn Ibrahim al-Ghazi, while his son Ḥamadūš became a garād under the imam. In the mid-1520s, Fatagar once again became one of the first provinces of Ethiopia where the imam exerted his influence.

== Sources and historiography ==
=== Sources ===
Francisco Álvares was chaplain to the Portuguese embassy that was in Ethiopia from 1520 to 1526. He was not present at the battle; he wrote down what he was told, above all by Pero da Covilhã, a Portuguese who had lived at the Ethiopian court since 1495. His account occupies chapter 114 of his narrative.

This chronicle contains a few sentences about Adal in the first chapter, which covers the reigns of three predecessors of Sarsa Dengel (r. 1563–1597) before turning to his own. As noted by Manfred Kropp, the anonymous author of the chronicle was a clergyman serving at the court of Sarsa Dengel who started writing after the king's coronation at Aksum and used earlier written accounts and oral tradition in his work. According to Kropp, the chapter on Lebna Dengel is an important source for these early conflicts with Adal, since the Futūḥ al-Ḥabaša mentions them only briefly. The original Ge'ez text, from the Bodleian manuscript catalogued as Aeth. XXIX, was published with an Italian translation by Carlo Conti Rossini in 1894. A more recent edition with the Ge'ez text and a German translation appeared in 1988 as a two-volume set by Manfred Kropp. The author calls Mahfuz the sultan's vizier but does not mention any geographical location for the battle, either in the Ge'ez text or in the two translations. Chekroun suggests that the Jesuit Pedro Páez, writing in the early seventeenth century, had recourse to this chronicle, as the account in Historia da Etiopia, Book III, ch. 2, resembles this one, whereas James Bruce largely paraphrased Álvares's chapter. (Note: Bruce's account postdates Álvares by more than two and a half centuries, and the precise nature of the connection between them has not been established beyond Chekroun's general observation that Bruce reused his account. For this reason, narrative detail drawn from Bruce alone is attributed to him specifically in this article, rather than treated as corroborating Álvares.)

The Muslim sources are largely silent. The Walasma' chronicle lists only sultans, and the Futūḥ al-Ḥabaša mentions Mahfuz's raids once, in passing, when describing the army's arrival at the river Dukham in Fatagar in 1528.

=== Dating ===
| Source | Date given | Notes |
|---|---|---|
| Álvares (written after 1520) | July; year not stated | Says the battle took place on the day Lopo Soares burned Zeila. Beckingham and Huntingford place that event in July 1517, but note that the two events cannot have fallen on the same day. (Note: Conti Rossini, following Barros, connects the easy capture of Zeila in 1517 to the absence of its governor Mahfuz, who he says had taken its militia with him to help the sultan. According to Chekroun, no primary source states that Mahfuz was governor of Zeila.) |
| James Bruce (1790) | July 1516 | Bruce also links it with the burning of Zeila. (Note: According to Chekroun (2023), Álvares and Bruce agree in linking the battle to the day Lopo Soares burned Zeila, and she states that Álvares elsewhere dates that burning to 1514, a third date, distinct from both his and Bruce's dates for the battle itself and from Beckingham and Huntingford's July 1517.) |
| Ethiopian chronicle | Lebna Dengel aged twenty | Chekroun infers 1516–1517. |
| Taddesse Tamrat (1972) | Implied c. 1516 | Reports that the official chronicles record no Christian victory until Lebna Dengel had reigned eight years; his note cites Conti Rossini's chronicle passage and Álvares's account of this battle, but he gives no calendar year. |
| Aregay (1971) | 1516 | Gives 1516 as the year of Mahfuz's death. |
| Abir (1980) | 1516 | |
| Pankhurst (1997) | July 1517 | Also notes the coincidence with Soares's attack on Zeila. |
| Deresse Ayenachew (2020) | 1517 | |
| Wagner (1991) | Not stated | Places the murder of Muhammad in 1518. |
| Chekroun (2013, 2023) | 1516–1517 | Regards the Zeila synchronism as inconclusive; notes that Álvares's statement that the emperor was seventeen or eighteen would imply 1514–1515. |

=== Who commanded the Adalite army? ===
Álvares, and later Bruce after him, describe Mahfuz as a commander who carried out raids for 25 years on his own, without the sultan's authority, and say the sultan joined him in person only for the final raid. Wagner similarly says that Muhammad, who wanted peace, was pressured into joining the raid on Fatagar by the "religious party." The Ethiopian chronicle and Páez instead describe an expedition led personally by the sultan, with Mahfuz serving as his army commander.

According to Chekroun, the assumption that there was a "party of opposition" headed by Mahfuz and his group does not stand up to the facts. First, she points out that campaigns which Álvares credits to Mahfuz were actually conducted by Sultan Muhammad according to the Futūḥ al-Ḥabaša. Second, Muhammad himself led at least three military campaigns against the Christians, in Bali, Dawaro, and Fatagar, between 1495 and 1517. Finally, the account of the Fatagar campaign may coincide with the description of Muhammad's failed jihad in the Futūḥ. In Chekroun's translation of the Futūḥ, Sultan Muhammad is introduced simply as ruler of the area for thirty years of the ninth Islamic century. It then says only that he waged jihad against the Ḥabaša, that many Muslims were killed in the fighting, and that he returned home afterward, without any mention of Mahfuz whatsoever. According to Chekroun, ʿArab Faqīh intentionally belittles Mahfuz: he cannot exclude him, since he is the father of the imam's wife, but he does not explain who Mahfuz was and instead attributes the expeditions Mahfuz carried out to the "legitimate" sultan Muhammad. Chekroun and Hirsch (2020) state that every mention of Mahfuz describes him as the head of the sultanate's army, acting under Sultan Muhammad's orders.

== See also ==
- Battle of Fatagar (1559)
- Ethiopian–Adal War

== Bibliography ==
- Abir, Mordechai (1980). Ethiopia and the Red Sea: The Rise and Decline of the Solomonic Dynasty and Muslim–European Rivalry in the Region. London: Frank Cass. ISBN 0-7146-3164-7.
- Aregay, Merid Wolde (1971). Southern Ethiopia and the Christian Kingdom, 1508–1708, with Special Reference to the Galla Migrations and Their Consequences (PhD thesis). School of Oriental and African Studies, University of London.
- Beckingham, C. F.; Huntingford, G. W. B. (1961). The Prester John of the Indies: A True Relation of the Lands of the Prester John, Being the Narrative of the Portuguese Embassy to Ethiopia in 1520 Written by Father Francisco Alvares. Works Issued by the Hakluyt Society, 2nd series, no. 115. Vol. 2. Translation by Lord Stanley of Alderley (1881), revised and edited with additional material. Cambridge: Cambridge University Press for the Hakluyt Society.
- Bruce, James (1790). Travels to Discover the Source of the Nile, in the Years 1768, 1769, 1770, 1771, 1772, and 1773. Vol. 3. Dublin: Sleater.
- Bruce, James (1805). Travels to Discover the Source of the Nile, in the Years 1768, 1769, 1770, 1771, 1772, and 1773. Vol. 3 (2nd, corrected and enlarged ed.). Edinburgh and London: Archibald Constable & Co.; Manners & Miller; and Longman, Hurst, Rees, & Orme.
- Chekroun, Amélie (2013). Le « Futūḥ al-Ḥabaša » : écriture de l'histoire, guerre et société dans le Bar Sa'ad ad-dīn (Éthiopie, XVIe siècle) (PhD thesis) (in French). Université Paris 1 Panthéon-Sorbonne.
- Chekroun, Amélie (2023). La conquête de l'Éthiopie : un jihad au XVIe siècle. Zéna (in French). Paris: CNRS Éditions. ISBN 978-2-271-14543-7.
- Chekroun, Amélie (2015). "Dakar, capitale du sultanat éthiopien du Barr Sa'd ad-dīn (1415–1520)". Cahiers d'études africaines (in French). 219: 569–586. doi:10.4000/etudesafricaines.18225.
- Chekroun, Amélie; Hirsch, Bertrand (2020). "The Sultanates of Medieval Ethiopia". In Kelly, Samantha (ed.). A Companion to Medieval Ethiopia and Eritrea. Leiden: Brill. pp. 86–112. ISBN 978-90-04-41943-8.
- Conti Rossini, Carlo (1894). "Storia di Lebna Dengel re d'Etiopia sino alle prime lotte contro Ahmad ben Ibrahim". Rendiconti della Reale Accademia dei Lincei: Classe di scienze morali, storiche e filologiche. 5 (in Italian). 3: 617–640.
- Derat, Marie-Laure (2003). Le domaine des rois éthiopiens (1270–1527): espace, pouvoir et monachisme. Histoire ancienne et médiévale (in French). Vol. 72. Paris: Publications de la Sorbonne. doi:10.4000/books.psorbonne.13766. ISBN 978-2-85944-480-8.
- Deresse Ayenachew (2020). "Territorial Expansion and Administrative Evolution under the "Solomonic" Dynasty". In Kelly, Samantha (ed.). A Companion to Medieval Ethiopia and Eritrea. Leiden: Brill. pp. 57–85. ISBN 978-90-04-41943-8.
- Kropp, Manfred (1988a). Die Geschichte des Lebna-Dengel, Claudius und Minās. Corpus Scriptorum Christianorum Orientalium (in Geez). Vol. 503. Scriptores Aethiopici 83; Ge'ez text. Louvain: Peeters.
- Kropp, Manfred (1988). Die Geschichte des Lebna-Dengel, Claudius und Minās [The History of Lebna Dengel, Claudius and Minas]. Corpus Scriptorum Christianorum Orientalium (in German). Vol. 504. Scriptores Aethiopici 84; German translation. Louvain: Peeters.
- Markham, Clements R. (1867–1868). "On the Early Portuguese Expeditions to Abyssinia". Proceedings of the Royal Geographical Society of London. 12 (1): 11–19. JSTOR 1799506.
- Pankhurst, Richard (1997). The Ethiopian Borderlands: Essays in Regional History from Ancient Times to the End of the 18th Century. Lawrenceville, NJ: Red Sea Press. ISBN 0-932415-19-9.
- Taddesse Tamrat (1972). Church and State in Ethiopia, 1270–1527. Oxford: Clarendon Press.
- Wagner, Ewald (1991). "The Genealogy of the Later Walashma' Sultans of Adal and Harar". Zeitschrift der Deutschen Morgenländischen Gesellschaft. 141 (2): 376–386. JSTOR 43378336.
