= Dawit II =

Emperor of Ethiopia from 1508 to 1540

- Negusa Nagast
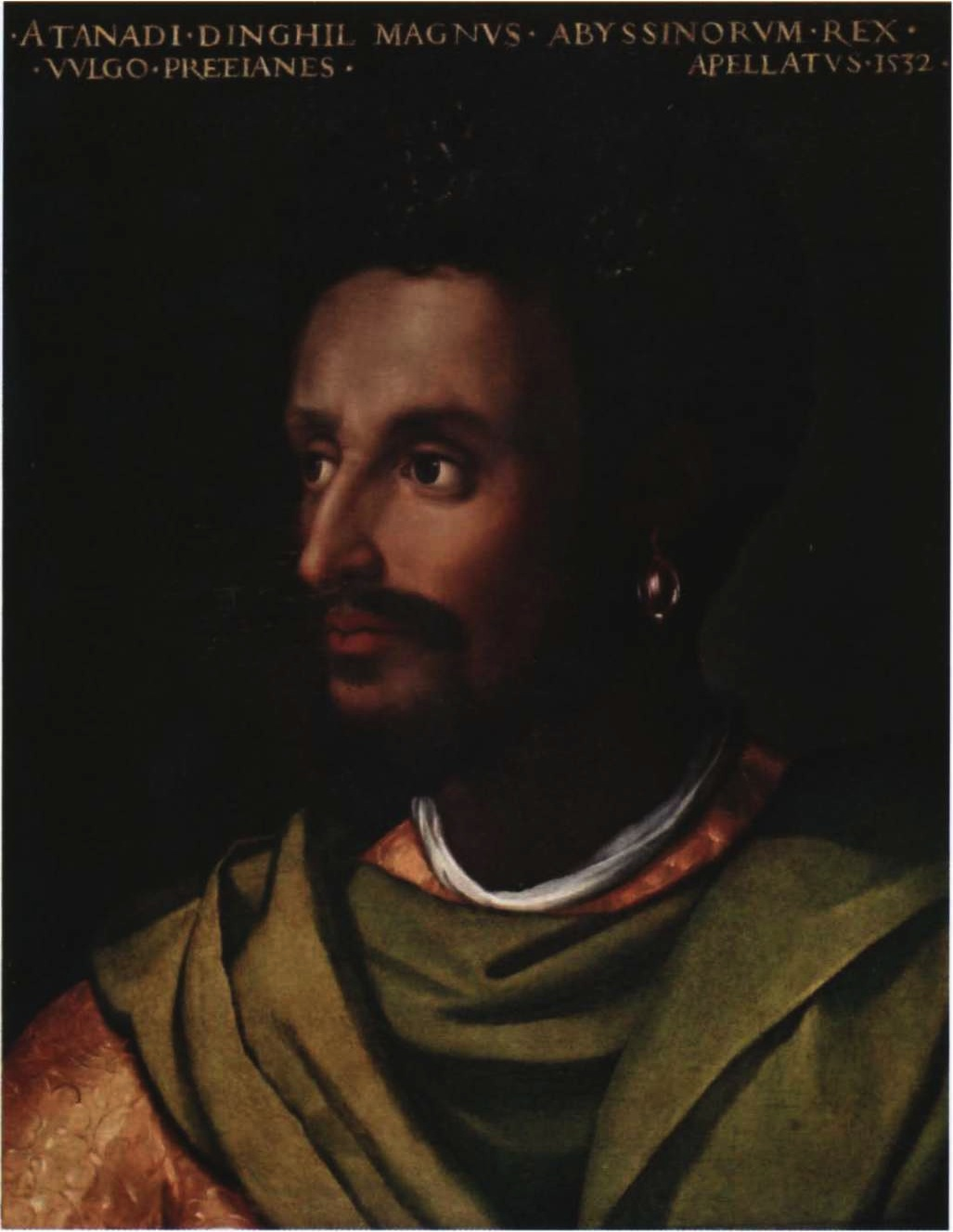
- Portrait by Cristofano dell'Altissimo, 1552–1558

Emperor of Ethiopia
- Reign: 31 July 1507 – 2 September 1540
- Coronation: 13 May 1508
- Predecessor: Na'od
- Successor: Gelawdewos
- Regent: Empress Eleni
- Born: c. 1496; Badeqe, Shewa, Ethiopian Empire
- Died: 2 September 1540 (aged 43–44); Debre Damo, Tigray, Ethiopian Empire
- Burial: Abba Aragwi Monastery
- Spouse: Seble Wongel
- Issue: Fiqtor Lebna Dengal; Gelawdewos; Yakob; Menas; Walatta Hanna; Amata Giyorgis; Sabana Giyorgis; Walatta Kidusan; Tewdada
Names
- Lebna Dengel
- Dynasty: House of Solomon
- Father: Na'od
- Mother: Na'od Mogesa
- Religion: Ethiopian Orthodox Church

Dawit II (Note: Sometimes anglicized to David II.) (Ge'ez: ዳዊት; c. 1496 – 2 September 1540), better known by his birth name of Lebna Dengel, (Note: Amharic: ልብነ ድንግል, romanized: Ləbna Dəngəl, lit. 'Essence of the virgin'.) and also known by the macaronic name Wanag Segad, (Note: Amharic: ወናግ ሰገድ, romanized: Wanag Sagad, lit. 'to Whom the Lions Bow'.) was Emperor of Ethiopia from 1508 to 1540, whose political center and palace was in Shewa.

A male line descendant of the medieval Amhara kings, and thus a member of the House of Solomon, he was the son of Emperor Na'od and Empress Na'od Mogesa. The important victory over the Adal's Emir Mahfuz may have given Dawit the appellation "Wanag Segad," which is a combination of Geʽez and the Harari terms.

== Biography ==
=== Early reign ===
In contrast to previous emperors, Dawit had only one wife, Seble Wongel, whom he married around 1512–13. The couple had eight children: four sons and four daughters. Taking only one wife throughout his life was seen as a Christian act that fit with the ideals of the Church.

Although she was well into her seventies, the Empress Mother Eleni stepped in to act as her step-great-grandson's regent until 1516, when he came of age. During this time, she was aware that the neighboring Muslim states were benefitting from the assistance of other, larger Muslim countries like the Ottoman Empire.

Eleni sought to neutralize this advantage by dispatching the Armenian, Mateus to Portugal to ask for assistance. However, the Portuguese response did not arrive in Ethiopia until much later, when an embassy led by Dom Rodrigo de Lima arrived at Massawa on 9 April 1520. Traversing the Ethiopian Highlands, they did not reach Dawit's camp until 19 October of that year. Francisco Álvares provided a description of the Emperor:

We saw the Prester John sitting on a platform of six steps very richly adorned. He had on his head a high crown of gold and silver, that is to say, one piece of gold and another of silver from the top downwards, and a silver cross in his hand; there was a piece of blue taffeta before his face which covered his mouth and beard, and from time to time they lowered it and the whole of his face appeared, and again they raised it. The Prester was dressed in a rich mantle of gold brocade, and silk shirts of wide sleeves. From his knees downwards he had a rich cloth of silk and gold well spread out like a Bishop's apron, and he was sitting in majesty as they paint God the Father on the wall. In age, complexion, and stature, he is a young man, not very black. His complexion might be chestnut or bay, not very dark in color; he is very much a man of breeding, of middling stature; they said that he was twenty-three years of age, and he looks like that, his face is round, the eyes large, the nose high in the middle, and his beard is beginning to grow. In presence and state he fully looks like the great lord that he is.

A follower of his late father, the monk Gebre Andrias slayed Emir Mahfuz of Adal in 1516, at the Battle of Fatagar (1516). About the same time, a Portuguese fleet attacked Zeila, a Muslim stronghold, and burned it. Dawit would then proceed to ravage Adal and lay waste to Sultan Muhammad ibn Azhar ad-Din's residence in Dakkar. Contemporaries concluded that the Muslim threat to Ethiopia was finally over, so when the diplomatic mission from Portugal arrived at last, Dawit denied that Mateus had the authority to negotiate treaties, ignoring Eleni's counsels. After a stay of six years, the Portuguese at last set sail and left a governing class who thought they were securely in control of the situation. As Paul B. Henze notes, "They were mistaken."

According to Ethiopian chronicles, two decades into Dawit's ascension, a young man by the name Ahmed Ibrahim had rebelled against the Adal leaders and spread terror in the region. Dawit sent his general Delghan into Adal to confront him however the Abyssinian army was defeated at the Battle of Hubat by Ahmed's warriors.

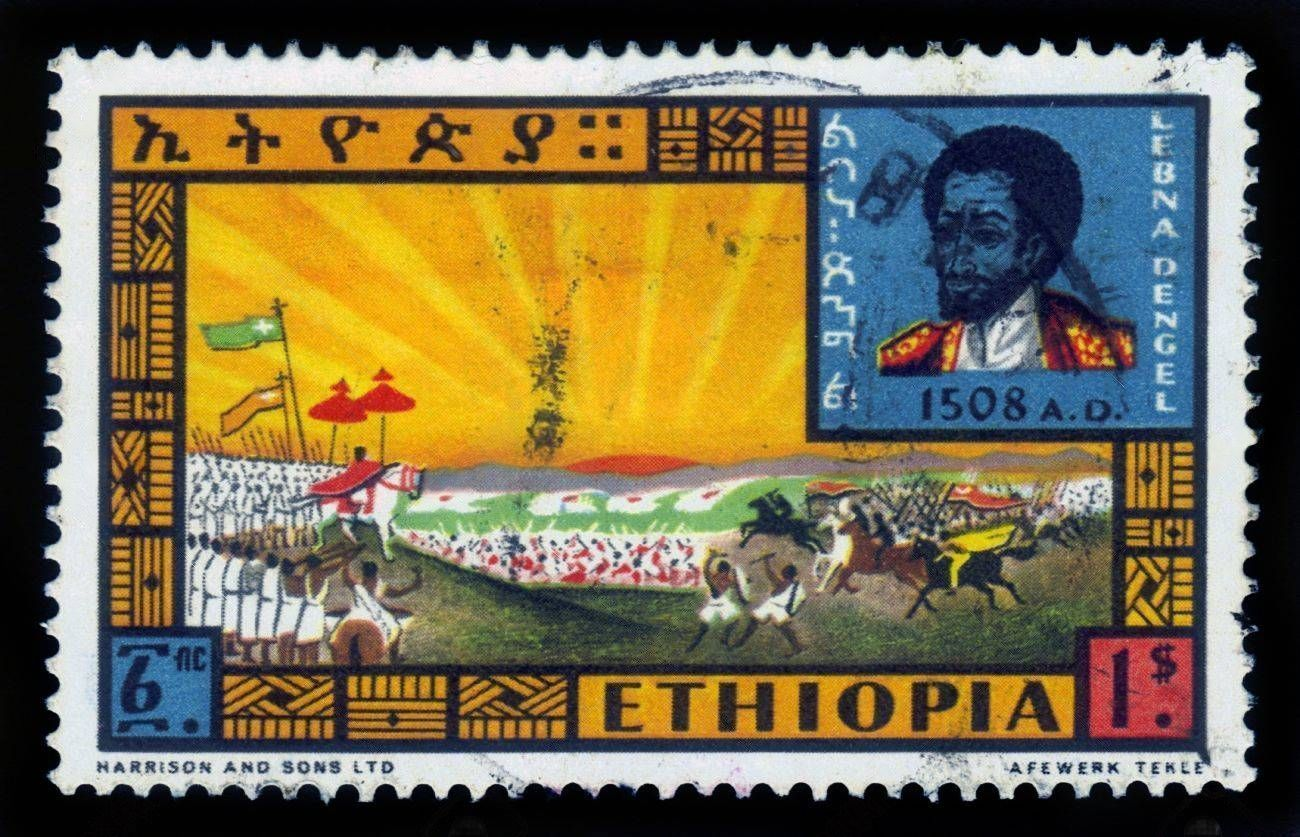
Stamp depicting Lebna Dengel and his army

=== Ethiopian–Adal War ===
With the death of Sultan Abu Bakr ibn Muhammad in 1520, a young general and imam, Ahmad ibn Ibrahim al-Ghazi, consolidated his hold on the Adal Sultanate, making his candidate Umar Din sultan. Shortly before this, the Ottoman Empire had conquered Mamluk Egypt and were looking to expand into the Red Sea region. The Ethiopians had previously stolen firearms from the Mamluks during the reign of Yeshaq I but had not put them to use. In the 1520s, Emperor Lebna Dengel bought two swivel-guns from the Portuguese, as well as fourteen muskets acquired from Turks, he was thus ill equipped for the Ottoman backed invasion in 1527 which included thousands of Turkish and Arab flintlocks and matchlocks. The Imam crossed the Awash River and entered Fatagar in 1528, looting and burning the town of Badeqe before Dawit could arrive with his army. He began to withdraw, retreating across the Samara, a tributary of the Awash.

The Imam's followers were accustomed to making lightning raids on Ethiopian territory, swiftly attacking and quickly returning home; they had no experience in pitched battles, and Ahmad Gragn struggled with numerous desertions.

The Emperor Dawit caught up with Imam Ahmad Gragn's forces, and they engaged in battle on either 7 or 9 March 1529, at the Battle of Shimbra Kure, but failed to destroy the Imam's army. Arab Faqīh states that many Somali on the left flank retreated from the battlefield, with the Ethiopians pursuing them and killing a large number of their men, but that the Harla on the right flank managed to hold their ground. While not a clear victory for the Imam, this battle still proved to the Imam's followers that they could fight and defeat the Ethiopian army.

Imam Ahmad Gragn spent the next two years preoccupied beyond the Awash, but returned to attack Ethiopia in 1531, where he scattered the army under the general Eslamu by firing the first cannon in the Horn of Africa. Dawit was forced to withdraw into the Ethiopian highlands and fortify the passes into Bet Amhara ("the House of Amhara"), leaving the territories to the east and south under the protection of his general Wasan Sagad. However, Wasan Sagad was slain near Mount Busat while fighting Ura'i Utman on 29 July (5 Nahase 1524 A.M.) and his army scattered.

The Imam surprised the Emperor at the Battle of Amba Sel on 27 October, where the Emperor was almost captured, a reversal, in the words of R.S. Whiteway, that left Lebna Dengel "never in a position to offer a pitched battle to his enemies." The Imam's followers poured into Bet Amhara, pillaging every church they found, including Mekane Selassie, Atronsa Maryam, Debre Nagwadgwad and Ganata Giyorgis. Emperor Dawit fell back behind the Abay River to the relative security of Gojjam. Only their failure to capture the royal compound at Amba Geshen slowed the Muslims down.

In April 1533, Ahmad once again assembled his troops at Debre Berhan to conquer—or at least ravage—the northern regions of Tigray, Begemder, and Gojjam.

Both Ethiopia and Dawit suffered heavily from these assaults. The Church of Our Lady Mary of Zion was destroyed, and the establishments on the islands of Lake Tana looted. Dawit's eldest son Fiqtor was killed at Zara in Wag by a lieutenant of Ahmad on 7 April 1537; another son, Menas, was captured on 19 May 1539, and later sent to Yemen.

=== Later life ===
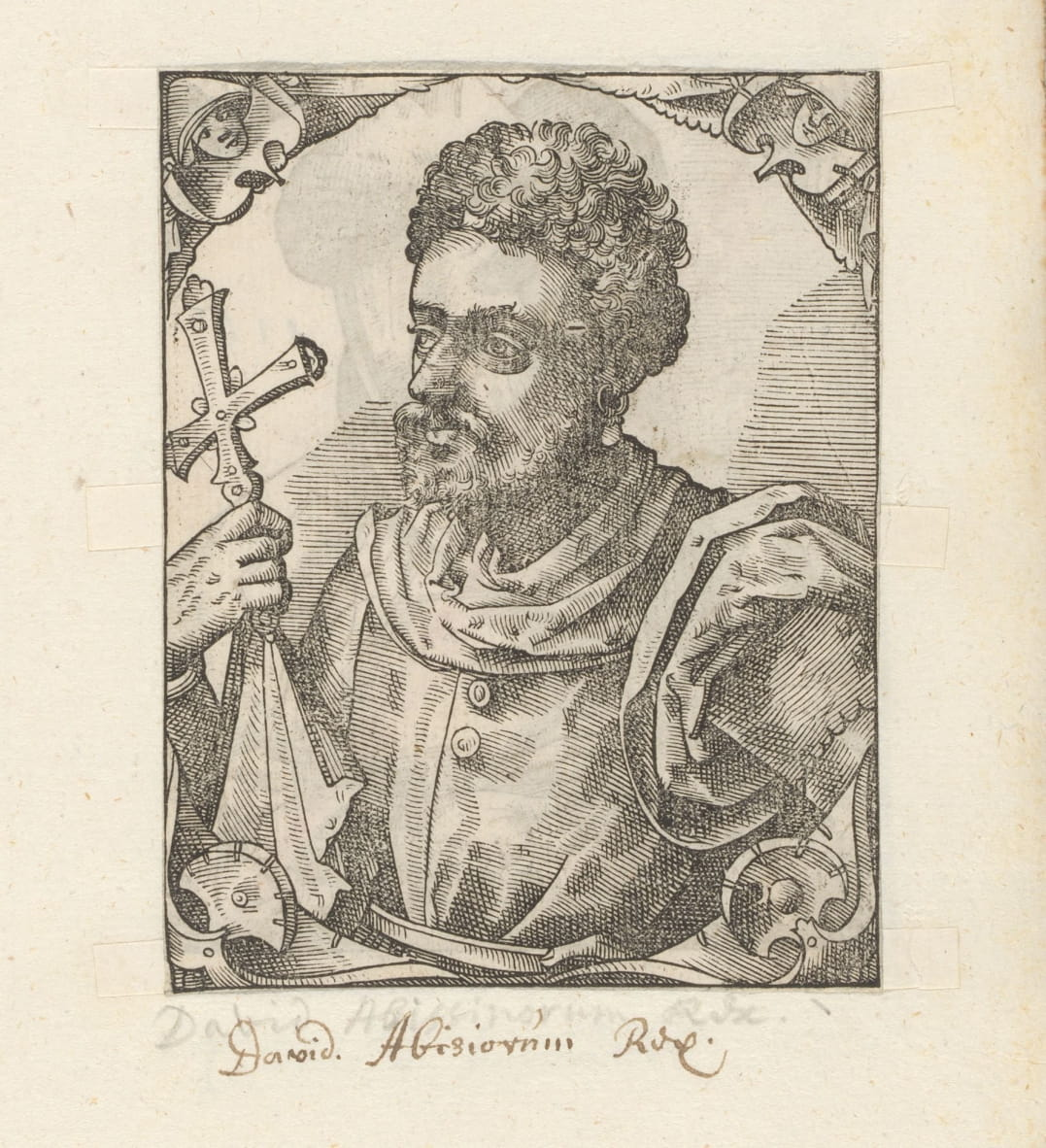
Illustration of Dawit II by Paolo Giovio

During the years he lived as an outlaw in his own realm constantly hounded by Imam Ahmed's soldiers the Malassay, Dawit came to see Queen Eleni's wisdom in reaching out to Europe for help, and he dispatched João Bermudes, who had arrived in Ethiopia with Dom Rodrigo de Lima, to request for military assistance. Bermudez traveled to Lisbon, where he was honorably received by John III of Portugal. The king acknowledged his title of "Patriarch of Ethiopia", which had been officially approved by the Pope. John III also provided him with letters addressed to the Portuguese Viceroy in India, directing the immediate dispatch of ships along with four to five hundred soldiers to assist the Abyssinian king in combating the Muslims.

In 1539, Gragn sent an embassy to Dawit and asked for his daughter in marriage, and pointed out to him that if he refused to do so, there was no one left with whom he could take refuge. The king replied, "I will not give her to you for you are an unbeliever; it is better to fall into the power of the Lord, Whose majesty is as great as His mercy, than into yours." Gragn was furious, and began a pursuit of the king, who wandered from desert to desert in nakedness, suffering from hunger, exhaustion and sickness.

When Dawit was in Dembiya, the Malassay came and captured most his soldiers, and he was force to flee with a few loyal followers to the mountain of Tchelmefra in the country of Simien. Dawit found refuge in this location but was once again pursued by the Malassay. Upon reaching the Tekezé River, he successfully crossed it and reached Tabr. There, he succeeded in killing Ahmad al-Din, the Adalite governor of Tigray, who had been plundering churches. Shortly after, Dawit died of a sickness that befell him.

Dawit was succeeded by his son Gelawdewos, as his son Menas had been captured by Ahmad a year before Dawit died. His release was not secured until 1543, when Queen Seble Wongel exchanged him for the captured son of Bati del Wambara and Ahmed after the Battle of Wayna Daga.

One of Dawit II's younger sons, Yaqob, is said to have stayed behind to hide in the province of Menz in Shewa. Yaqob's grandson Susenyos I defeated his various second cousins in 1604 to become Emperor and started the Gondar line of the Solomonic dynasty. Another grandson started the Shewan line of the Solomonic dynasty. Dawit II is commemorated as a saint by the Ethiopian Church with a feast day of Meskerem 5.

== Notes ==
Regnal titles
Preceded by Na'od	Emperor of Ethiopia; 1508–1540	Succeeded by Gelawdewos
