= Ali ibn Umar Din =

ʿAli ibn ʿUmar Dīn علي بن عمر الدين

Sultan of the Adal Sultanate
- Reign: 1553–1555
- Predecessor: Umar Din (1526–1553)
- Successor: Barakat ibn Umar Din (1555–1559)
- Dynasty: Walashmaʿ dynasty
- Religion: Islam

ʿAli ibn ʿUmar Dīn (Arabic: علي بن عمر الدين), (reigned 1553–1555), was a Sultan of the Adal Sultanate in the Horn of Africa. He was the son of Umar Din and the brother of Barakat ibn Umar Din.

== See also ==
- Walashmaʿ dynasty

Preceded by Umar Din (1526–1553)	Walashmaʿ sultans of Adal; 1553–1555	Succeeded by Barakat ibn Umar Din (1555–)
