= Battle of Hubat =

1500s battle of the Adal Sultanate and Solomonic dynasties in medieval Ethiopia

- Part of the Adalite Civil War
Date	1500s
Location	Hubat, Adal Sultanate
Result	Adalite victory: Ahmed's popularity increases in Adal; Build up to the Ethiopian-Adal War

Belligerents
Hubat principality	Ethiopian Empire

Commanders and leaders
Ahmad ibn Ibrahim al-Ghazi; Abu Bakr Qecchin	Degelhan

Strength
Unknown, estimates range from 4,000 to 7,000 including Malassay	Unknown, estimates range from 4,500 to 7,500

Casualties and losses
Unknown	Sixty horses and 400 men captured

The Battle of Hubat was fought between the forces of Hubat principality led by Emir of Adal Ahmad ibn Ibrahim al-Ghazi, and the Abyssinian army, under Degelhan. This was the first encounter between Ahmed's forces with Abyssinians. Ahmed was known as Emir during this battle as he was yet to be given the title Imam.

== Battle ==
Upon hearing that a rebel named Ahmed Ibrahim was in a power struggle with the Adal leaders, the Emperor of Ethiopia Dawit II sent his general Degelhan to confront him. The Abyssinian campaign originally seemed successful as large amounts of women and children of Adal were captured by Degelhan including the mother of Ahmed's commander Abu Bakr Qecchin. Meanwhile Emir Ahmed had laid a trap in Hubat, splitting his unit into three, he waited for the Abyssinians to enter the region after sacking Harar and ambushed them. The remaining Abyssinian army who were not killed fled in panic, thus Ahmed's troops won decisively and were able to recover stolen booty.

== Aftermath ==
According to the Abyssinian chronicles, the Adalites, following their victory, commenced to sing the following:

A victorious son has risen as the protector of his people!
A mighty son has plundered the spoils of mighty heroes who led his land into captivity!
A warlike son has avenged his people's murderers twofold!

In the course of Adal's subsequent invasion of Ethiopia, Degelhan's insights gained from this conflict prompted him to alert Emperor Dawit II regarding the peril posed by the Malassay elite forces, emphasizing that the imperial troops were inadequately prepared to confront them.
