= Deguma, Ethiopia =

Village in Amhara Region, Ethiopia

Deguma
- Village
- Location in Ethiopia Deguma (Africa)
- Coordinates: 12°27′N 37°42′E
- Country: Ethiopia
- Region: Amhara
- Zone: North Gondar
- Elevation: 2,000 m (6,600 ft)

Population (2007)
  - Total: 2,448
- Time zone: UTC+3 (EAT)

Deguma or Dagoma is a village in northwest Ethiopia. It is located in the North Gondar Zone of the Amhara Region along the main road that links Gondar with Bahir Dar near Lake Tana. The town has a latitude and longitude of 12°27′N 37°42′E with an elevation of 2,000 meters above sea level.

Two kilometers from the village is believed to be the burial site of the 16th century Adalite conqueror Ahmad ibn Ibrahim al-Ghazi.

== Tomb ==
According to local legend, after the Battle of Wayna Daga, the wounded Imam dragged himself to a tree stump where he rested, a swarm of bees then attacked the Imam and stung him to death. Another story is that the mortally wounded Imam was carried away from the battlefield but died of his wounds and was buried on a nearby hillside by his wife. This area is called Sentara by the locals and is considered to be his burial site.

Ali II of Yejju revived the cult of Ahmed Ibrahim through initiating a mandatory pilgrimage to his tomb in the area, this tomb was destroyed and vandalized by the local Christian populace sometime later. However, in 1991 the Muslim community of the area built a tomb in the hypothetically historical burial site of Ahmad ibn Ibrahim.

== Demographics ==
Based on figures from the Central Statistical Agency in 2007, this town has an estimated total population of 2,448 of whom 1,098 were male and 1,350 female.
