= Barakat ibn Umar Din =

Sultan of the Adal Sultanate

Barakāt ibn ʿUmar Dīn بركات بن عمر الدين

Sultan of the Adal Sultanate
- Reign: 1555–1559
- Predecessor: Ali ibn Umar Din (1553–1555)
- Successor: Nur ibn Mujahid (1559–1567)
- Died: 1559; Harar
- Dynasty: Walashmaʿ dynasty
- Religion: Islam

Barakāt ibn ʿUmar Dīn (Arabic: بركات بن عمر الدين), (reigned 1555–1559), was the nominal Sultan of the Adal Sultanate in the Horn of Africa. A son of Umar Din (r. 1526–1553) and a brother of Ali ibn Umar Din (r. 1553–1555), he was the last known member of the Walashma dynasty to rule Adal.

In 1555, Barakat and Ali Jamal ibn al-Imam Ahmad led an army into Dawaro with the intent of taking it from the Ethiopians. However, he was defeated by the Governor of Dawaro. When Nur ibn Mujahid invaded the Ethiopian Empire in 1559, sultan Barakat held Harar against the army of Hamalmal, who had been sent there by his cousin, Emperor Gelawdewos. Dejazmatch Hamalmal and Ras Fasil killed him and sacked the city.

Preceded by Ali ibn Umar Din	Walashma dynasty	Succeeded by Dynasty exterminated
