= Khalif Farah Hayir =

Somalian poet

Khaliif Faarax Hayir (Af Soomaali: Khaliif Faarax Xayir) is a Somalian poet who uses the Geeraar style of poetry.

Hayir or Khaliif Xayir, as he is known in Af Soomaali, often creates patriotic poems as well as poems addressing various Somali social issues. Khalif's poems are so far available only in Af Soomaali. He contributed to a "Greeted Chain" poems meeting held in Abudwak and broadcast on Radio Abudwak.

Since 2008, Hayir has created poems much appreciated inside Somalia and the Somali diaspora in Europe and North America.

"Hearbroken" (Af Soomaali: Qarracan) is the poem that made Hayir a young famous poet across Somalia.

== Works ==
He wrote the following two poems highlighting the 2011 East Africa drought which hit Somalia; the drought was the severest in 60 years.

- "Heartbroken" Qarracan
- "Goodbye Poem" Dardaaran Gabay

Hayir participated in a form of poetry called "chain poetry" in Af Soomaali where a number of poets comment recited poem by adding their own version of the story in the form of an answer by denouncing or given a general comment on the recited poem. This contained twelve poems by different poets and its name is "Greeted Chain" or Silsiladii Salaamanay in Af Soomaali.
