= Mohamed Ali Facaye =

Sheikh Mohamed Ali Facaye (Somali: Sheekh Maxamed Cali Facaye), is the director for the Kismayo Regional Islamic Courts under the government of the Juba Valley Alliance.

On June 8, 2004, Facaye's new post was announced at a well-organized meeting attended by all sectors of the Jubaland administration and population. Barre Adan Shire Hiiraale was present on this occasion.

The Deputy Director of Kismayo Islamic Courts is Sheekh Maxamed Aadan Cabdulle. The Kismayo Courts system has its own army of over 100 personal.
