= Umar Din =

ʿUmar Dīn عمر الدين
- Sultan

Sultan of the Adal Sultanate
- Reign: 1526–1553
- Predecessor: Abu Bakr ibn Muhammad (1525–1526)
- Successor: Ali ibn Umar Din (1553–1555)
- Dynasty: Walashmaʿ dynasty
- Religion: Islam

ʿUmar Dīn (Arabic: عمر الدين), (reigned 1526–1553), was a Sultan of the Adal Sultanate in the Horn of Africa. He was the younger brother of Abu Bakr ibn Muhammad. According to historian Richard Pankhurst, Umar was of Harari background.

== Reign ==
After his brother Abu Bakr ibn Muhammad was killed by Imam Ahmad ibn Ibrahim al-Ghazi (1506–1543) in 1526, Umar Din was made sultan by Imam Ahmad. He ruled as a puppet king, with Imam Ahmad wielding true power.

The Futuh al-Habasha of Sihab ad-Din records that the Sultan and the Imam quarrelled over the distribution of the alms tax at some point between the Battle of Shimbra Kure and the Battle of Amba Sel, which led to Imam Ahmad leaving Harar to live amongst the Somalis in Zeila for some time.

He was succeeded by his son Ali ibn Umar Din in 1553, who in turn was succeeded by his brother Barakat ibn Umar Din, the last member of the Walashmaʿ dynasty, in 1555.

== Notes ==
=== Works cited ===
- Spencer Trimingham, John (1952). Islam in Ethiopia. Oxford: Oxford University Press. OCLC 458382994.
- Tamrat, Taddesse (1977). "Ethiopia, the Red Sea and the Horn". In Oliver, Roland (ed.). The Cambridge History of Africa. Volume 3: from c. 1050 to c. 1600. Cambridge: Cambridge University Press. pp. 98–182. ISBN 978-0-521-20981-6.

Preceded by Abu Bakr ibn Muhammad (1525–1526)	Walashmaʿ sultans of Adal (1526–1553)	Succeeded by Ali ibn Umar Din (1553–1555)
