= Ahmad ibn Ibrahim al-Ghazi =

16th century Imam and General of the Adal Sultanate

Ahmad ibn Ibrahim al-Ghazi أحمد بن إبراهيم الغازي
- Imam
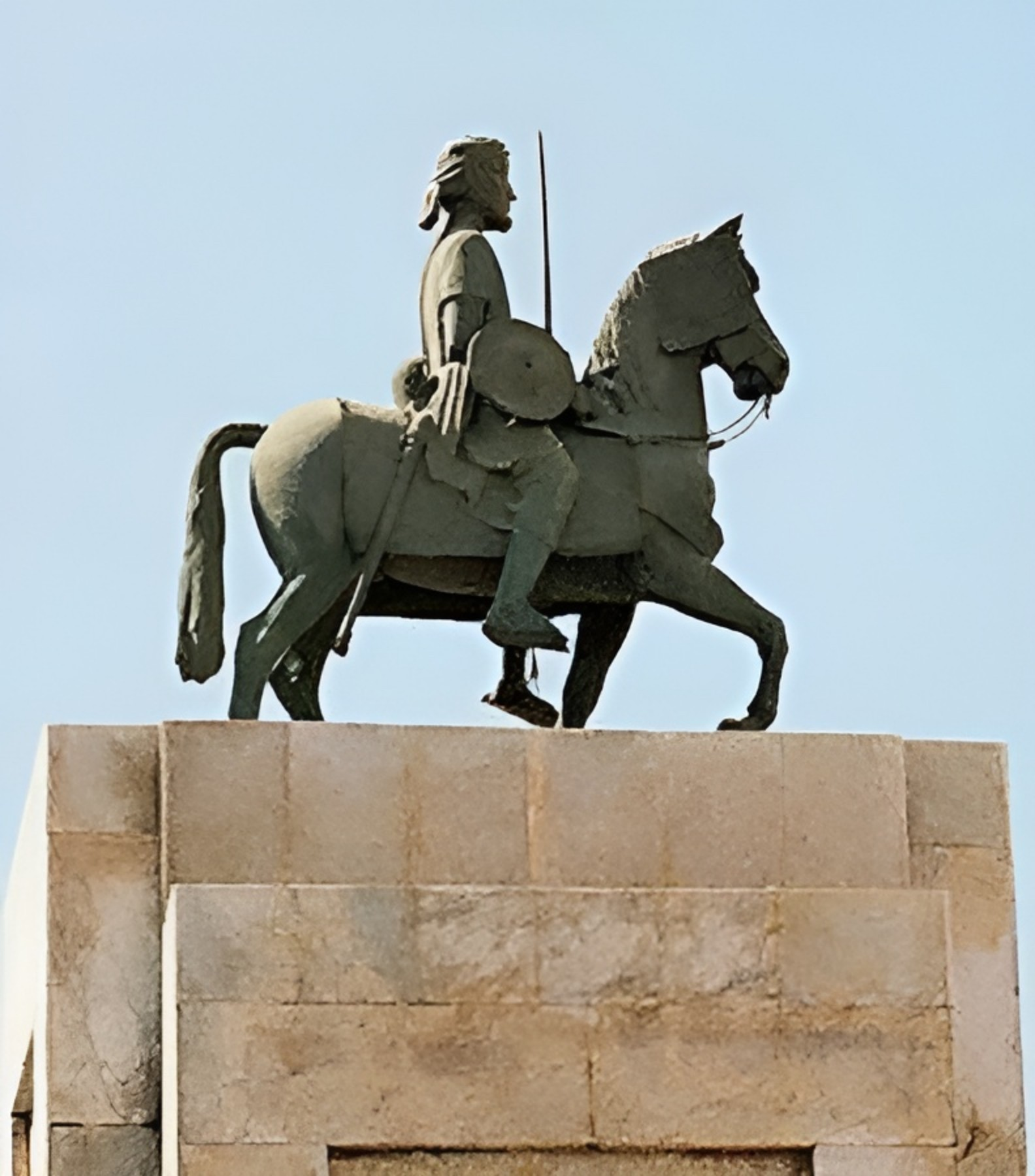
- Statue of Imam Ahmad in Mogadishu, Somalia

Leader of Adal
- Reign: c. 1527 – 21 February 1543
- Predecessor: Abu Bakr ibn Muhammad
- Successor: Nur ibn Mujahid
- Born: c. 1506; Hubat, Adal Sultanate
- Died: 21 February 1543 (aged 36–37); Wayna Daga, Ethiopian Empire
- Burial: Sentara
- Spouse: Bati del Wambara; Mureyas; Daughter of Makattar; Hajirah^{(concubine)}; Niece of Dawit II^{(concubine)}
- Issue: Mohammad ibn Ahmad; Ahmed ibn Ahmad Al-Najashi; Nasr Ad-Din ibn Ahmad
- Religion: Sunni Islam

Ahmad ibn Ibrahim al-Ghazi (Arabic: أحمد بن إبراهيم الغازي, Harari: አሕመድ ኢብራሂም አል-ጋዚ, Somali: Axmed Ibraahim al-Qaasi; c. 21 July 1506 – 10 February 1543) was the Imam of the Adal Sultanate from 1527 to 1543. Commonly named ግራኝ አህመድ (Grañ Ahmed) in Amharic and Gurey in Somali, both meaning "the left-handed", he led the invasion and conquest of Abyssinia from the Sultanate of Adal during the Ethiopian–Adal War. He is often referred to as the "King of Zeila" in medieval texts.

Dubbed "The African Attila" by Orientalist Frederick A. Edwards, Imam Ahmed's conquests reached all the way to the borders of the Sultanate of Funj. Imam Ahmed won nearly all his battles against the Ethiopians before 1541 and after his victory at Battle of Amba Sel, the Ethiopian Emperor, Dawit II was never again in a position to offer a pitched battle to his army and was subsequently forced to live as an outlaw constantly hounded by Imam Ahmed's soldiers, the Malassay. Ahmed Grañ was subsequently defeated following a Portuguese intervention, which drew his war into a broader geo-political struggle between the Portuguese and Ottoman empires. The memory and legacy of his invasion nonetheless persists in both modern Ethiopia and Somalia.

== Early years ==
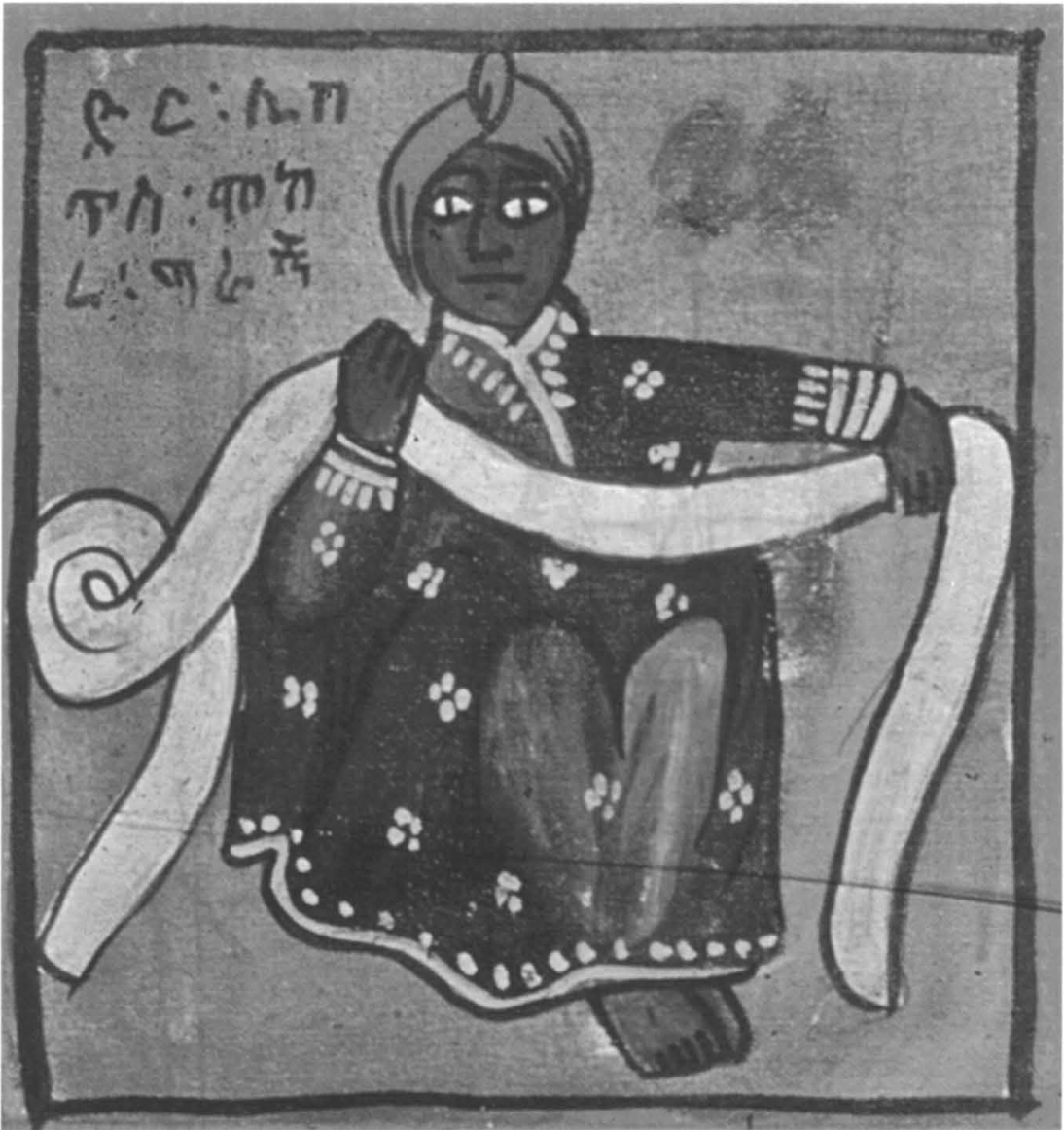
An illustration of the young Ahmad ibn Ibrahim demonstrating his strength

Ahmad ibn Ibrahim al-Ghazi was born in 1506 and hailed from the lowlands of Hubat in the Adal Sultanate. The ethnicity of Ahmad ibn Ibrahim is disputed, with historians regarding him as either an ethnic Somali a Harla/Harari, son of Garad of Sim or a Balaw. Ahmad spent a great deal of time in the city of Harar. According to sixteenth century Adal writer Arab Faqīh, due to the secular rule of Sultan Abu Bakr ibn Muhammad, Ahmad would leave Harar and return to Hubat. After the death of Imam Mahfuz, Garad Abun Adashe would become the most popular ruler of Adal, sparking conflict with the ruling Walashma dynasty for seven years. As a Malassay of Garad Abun, Ahmad joined Adashe in his power struggles against the Walashma. It was during this conflict that Ahmad demonstrated his courage, intelligence and military leadership. Garad Abun, who was astonished by the military valour of Ahmad, arranged for him to marry the late Mahfuz's youngest daughter, Bati del Wambara. The Adal sultan Abu Bakr ibn Muhammad is said to have established his capital at Harar and recruited a large number of Somalis into his army. Together with his Somali allies Abu Bakr defeated and killed Adashe near Zeila in 1525. The remnants of Adashe's Harla forces retreated back to Hubat where their numbers soon rose to over 100. The Sultan attempted to pursue but Ahmad defeated the Sultan in the field; Abu Bakr was forced to take refuge in Ogaden with his Somali allies. Ahmad did not follow him. After raising another large body of Somali followers, Abu Bakr met Ahmad for the second time. It was an indecisive clash that only forced the Sultan to retreat back into the Ogaden and Ahmad remained in Hubat as an independent governor of the rebel province.

Upon hearing that a rebel named Ahmad ibn Ibrahim was in a power struggle with the Adal leaders, the Emperor of Ethiopia Dawit II sent his general Degelhan to confront him. The Abyssinian campaign originally seemed successful as large amounts of women and children of Adal were captured by Degelhan including the mother of Ahmad's commander Abu Bakr Qecchin. Meanwhile, Emir Ahmad had laid a trap in Hubat: splitting his unit into three, he waited for the Abyssinians to enter the region after sacking Harar and ambushed them in the Battle of Hubat. The remaining Abyssinian army who were not killed fled in panic, thus Ahmed's troops won decisively and were able to recover stolen booty. Ahmad's victory not only strengthened his fighting capacity, but also spread his fame far and wide. The Sultan hearing about this gathered a large force of his Somali followers and besieged his capital at Siege of Hubat. Ahmad was unprepared and in a mountain encampment on Gara Muleta. The sultan besieged Ahmad and his small force for ten days, when he hoped to starve them. However, at this critical moment, the sheikhs of Harar intervened and reconciled the two leaders. Ahmad was forced to recognize the authority of the Adalite state for the first time in his career.

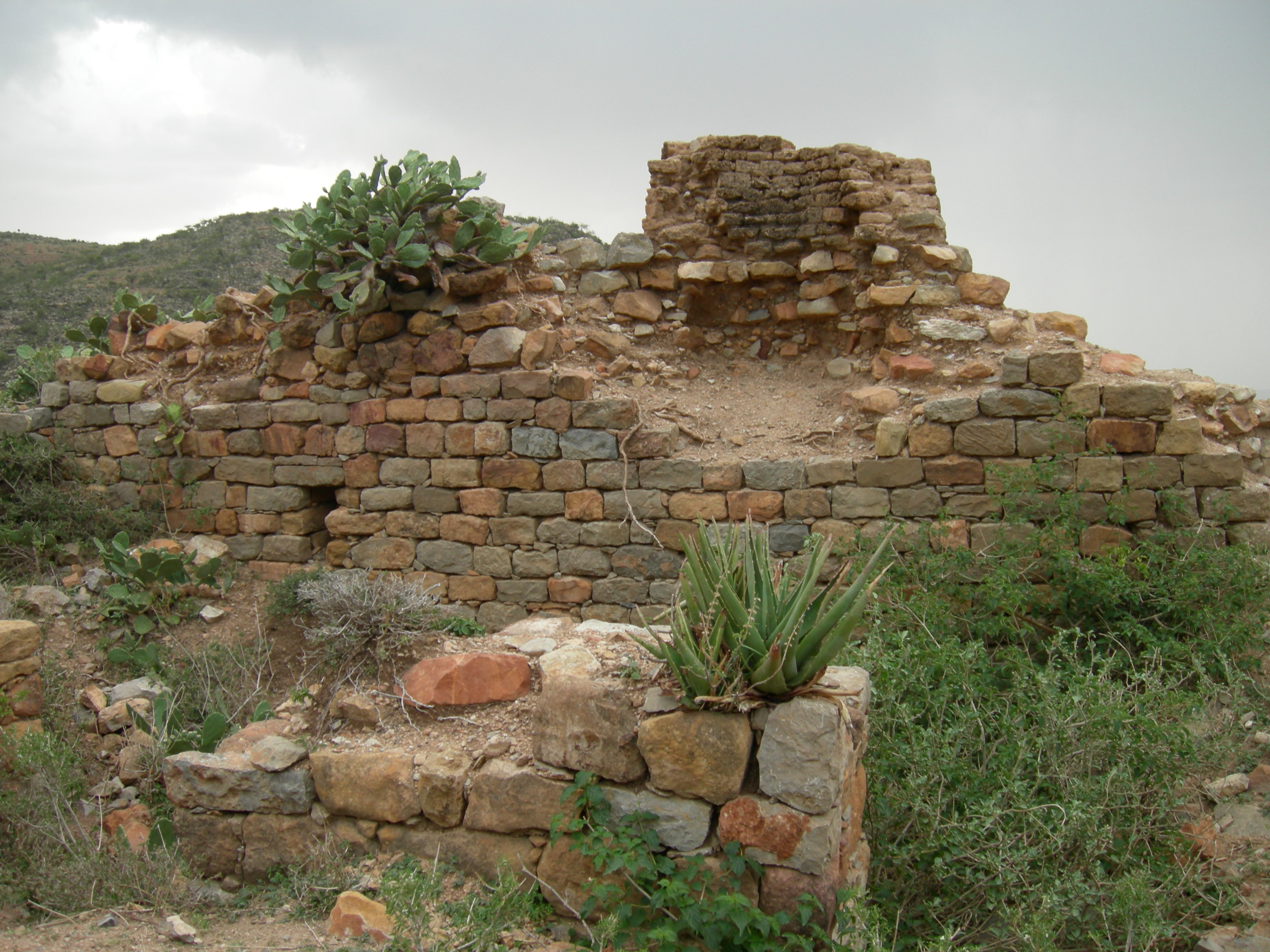
Ruins of Hubat near Dire Dawa

This peace was immediately broken by Abu Bakr, who tried to assassinate Ahmad while he was in Harar, Ahmad fled back to Hubat where he continued to struggle against the Sultan. At about this time a swarm of bees enlightened on Ahmad's head, this incident was considered so miraculous that people gave him the title of Imam. After much war the Imam defeated and killed Abu Bakr who fled to the Ogaden among his Somali supporters. He then returned to Harar where he placed Umar Din on the throne as his puppet. Imam Ahmad would spend the next several months in subjugating the surrounding Somali clans with diplomacy and war. He had hoped to unite all the warring Muslim nomads under his authority which he had done so successfully. The Imam was also able to start stockpiling on firearms such as the matchlock musket, cannons, and the arquebus, which he obtained from Arabia via the port of Zeila. Before carrying out his invasion of Ethiopia, it is said he had access to several cannons as well as several well armed soldiers from Yemen through association with the Ba 'Alawiyya. He invited the Somali chiefs of the area to participate in his jihad (holy war) against Ethiopia. Besides the Somalis, Ahmad had also incorporated into his army other peoples in the area who had been in continuous conflict with the Christian empire ever since the fourteenth century, such as the Harla, the Argobba, the Afar and the Arabs. By about 1527–9, the Imam was at the head of a strong state, with an ever-increasing sphere of influence in the interior of the Horn, and ready to lead the crucial military offensive against the Christian empire.

== Invasion of Abyssinia ==
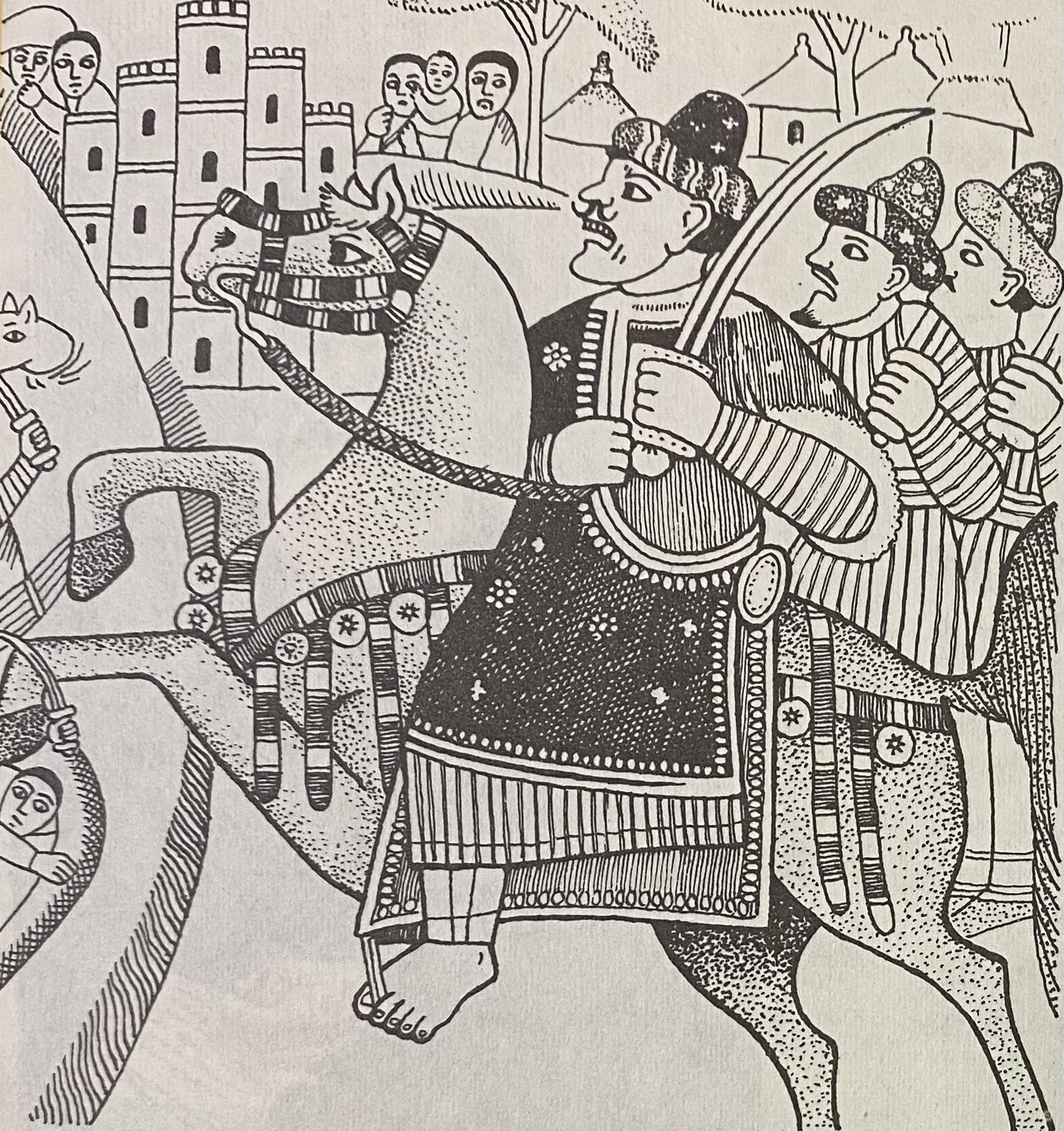
Early 20th century illustration of Imam Ahmad

The chronicle of Imam Ahmad's invasion of Abyssinia is depicted in various Arabic, Abyssinian and other foreign sources. In 1529 Imam Ahmad finally decided to embark on a conquest of Abyssinia, he soon met the Abyssinians at the Battle of Shimbra Kure. The Emperor had apparently expected this confrontation, and had mobilized a large army to defend his realms. The troops were recruited from all over the empire and the list of Christian generals who participated in the battle includes the Bahr-Negash and other officials from Medri Bahri, many district governors from Tigray, Amhara, the Agaw territories, Begemder, Gojjam, Shewa, as well as from the frontier provinces of Ifat, Fatagar, Dawaro, Bali and Damot. Although they differ in the corresponding figures which they give, both Christian and Muslim sources are unanimous about the superiority of the Emperor's army in terms of the numbers of soldiers. Despite the enormous size of the Abyssinians' army, the Imam was able to inflict a devastating defeat on the Christians and routed them completely. Richard Pankhurst attributes Imam Ahmad's victory to the presence amongst his followers of matchlockmen. This battle was probably the first time Ethiopian forces had to fight against a force equipped with firearms. He adds that the Abyssinians were unable to endure the “Thunder of the Turkish artillery” and did not know how to cure the wounds which the bullets made.

However, the Imam wasn't able to take advantage of this victory immediately due to tribal infighting within his army. He was forced to return to Harar to resolve disputes between the different tribes that made up his army. He used this opportunity to build up an army that was loyal to him and not to any specific tribal leaders. Finally in 1531 he reconstructed his forces and was able to begin the definite invasion and occupation of Abyssinia. With the help of his advanced weaponry he was able to inflict another crushing defeat on the Abyssinians during the Battle of Antukyah which allowed the Adalites to occupy Fatagar and Shewa. The Imam then dispatched his Somali brother in law, Garad Matan, to Ifat telling him to struggle against the inhabitants until he had forced them to submit. The Adalites continued to advance northwards securing the province of Bete Amhara by the end of the year. Dawit II fell back behind the Abay River to the relative security of Gojjam. It was here in Amhara that the Adalites came across many churches and palaces built by the Abyssinians. The Imam was stunned by the beauty of these churches and according to Arab Faqih:

The Imam asked all the Arabs who were with him, "Is there the like of this church, with its images and its gold, in Byzantium, or in India, or in any other place?" They replied, "We never saw or heard of its like in Byzantium or India or anywhere in the world."

Nevertheless, he ordered all of the churches built by the Abyssinians to be destroyed, including Mekane Selassie, Atronsa Maryam, Debre Nagwadgwad and Ganata Giyorgis. He soon campaigned against the people of Bali and Dawaro which was governed by Degalhan who had earlier pillaged Adal. The Imam and his forces would masquerade as Christian adherents of Degalhan to covertly infiltrate Abyssinian lands. Nevertheless, despite the Imam unintentionally communicating in the language of the Muslim Adalites, which historian Pankhurst identifies as Harari, they managed to succeed without raising any alarms. They were able to defeat the Abyssinians in the Battle of Amba Sel but this was quite difficult as the Christians were able to inflict serious losses on the soldiers of the Imam because they held the high ground, among the dead was the Imam's right-hand man, Garad Matan. The Adalites attempted to capture Degalhan but he was able to escape through Hadiya. For the next two years the Adalites would secure the southern Abyssinian provinces of Dawaro, Bali, Fatagar, Hadiya and Wej. After the Adalites conquered Damot and subjugated the pagans of Gafat the Imam marched north with his army.

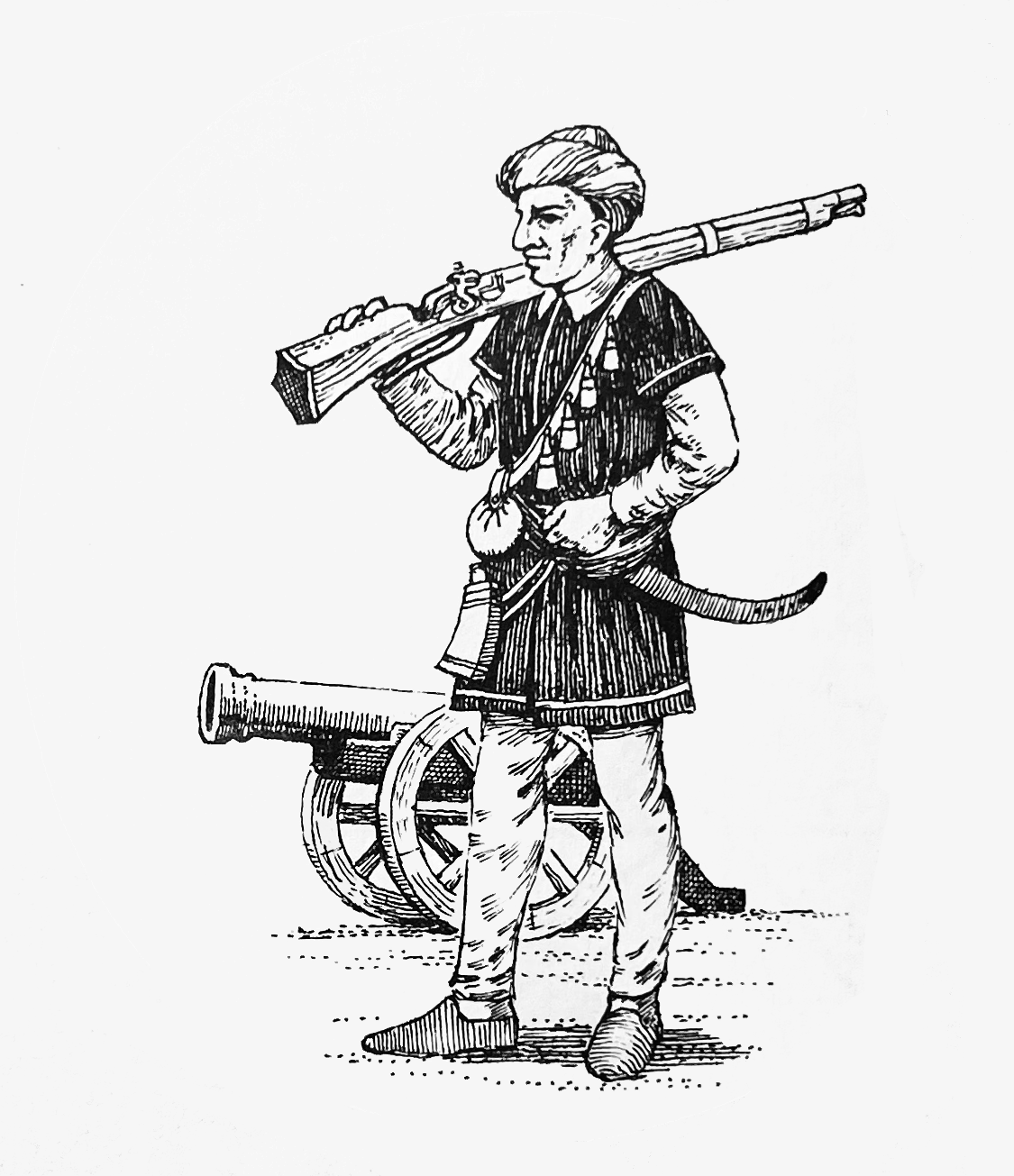
A soldier of Imam Ahmad armed with a musket and a cannon

The Imam was passionately interested in converting newly occupied territories as his men were made up of religious zealots. But many of the conversions were forced. While in the Debre Berhan area the Imam learned that the locals had not converted to Islam nor did they offer to pay jizya. He then ordered that anyone who failed to embrace Islam should be brought before him. Among those brought before the Imam were two Christian chiefs, finding them adamant in their faith, he then declared “We have decided to cut your heads off!” To which the Christians replied “Very well”. The Imam was surprised but ordered them to be put to death. The Imam would then call an assembly of his Emirs, chieftains and all the Muslim leaders to state his intention of staying in Abyssinia, "Praised be God who has conquered the whole of the land of Abyssinia. Now let us send to the land of Sa'd ad-Din, to bring up our wives and our children. Let us make our homes in Abyssinia. It is no longer possible for us to go back down to our country, or to leave this one."

They would then make plans to invade Tigray where the Emperor now resides. He first went through Angot where he was able to convince the people to convert to Islam. He then laid sieged to the fortress of Amba Geshen, around the same time the Adalites captured the Emperor's niece whom the Imam turned into his concubine. The Imam was able to acquire newly purchased cannons imported from Zeila which helped bring down the fortress. Arab Faqih states that thousands of Christians were captured, the Imam ordered those captured to be beheaded. As the Imam marched into Tigray, his cousin Zaharbui Muhammad was killed in an ambush. The Imam grieved over his death and the next day he set out with his army eager to avenge the death of his cousin.

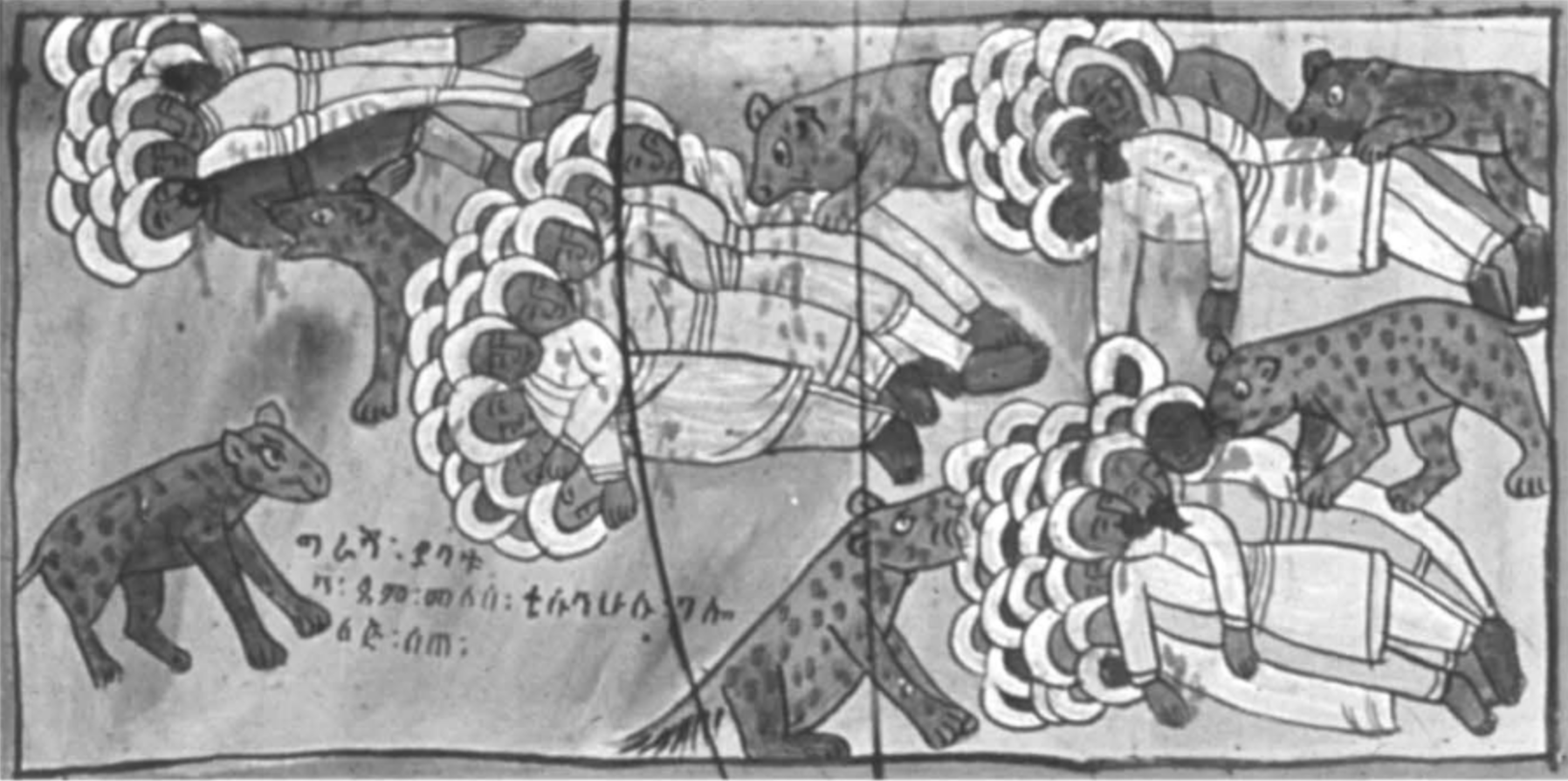
An illustration of the Imam's order for the Ethiopian priests be eaten alive by hyenas

He defeated the armies of Agame and Tembien and marched towards Aksum, but the locals of Tigray had all assembled to defend their holy city. The Imam defeated and killed a large number of them as Arab Faqih states, "Not a single one managed to slip away. They killed them in the forts, in the valleys and in the gorges. The ground was so thickly covered with their corpses, that it was impossible to walk in that place because of the dead bodies." He estimates that over 10,000 Christians were killed. The Imam reached Aksum whereupon he destroyed the Church of Our Lady Mary of Zion. While in Aksum, a Balaw man informed the Adalites that the Christians had barricaded and hid themselves near the Abba Garima Monastery. When the Iman heard this news he set out to find them, when he found them he ordered them to pay jizya but they refused so he massacred them. An army division from Adal crossed the Mareb River and conquered Medri Bahri, the subsequent Adalite occupation was bitterly resisted by the locals who killed the Imam's nephew, Vizier 'Addole, sending his head to the Ethiopian Emperor. The Emperor upon receiving it had drums beaten and flutes played, optimistically declaring that the fortunates of the war were soon turning. The Imam, enraged at the death of his nephew marched with his forces into Seraye and massacred the locals.

Dawit II had fled to Dembiya with his remaining followers, who were suffering from hunger and exhaustion. The Imam pursued the Abyssinians until they crossed the Blue Nile. After this Imam returned to Tigray where he discovered the region was undergoing a severe famine that took a huge toll on the Adalite army. The conditions were so dire that many Muslims in Ahmad's army converted to Christianity, realizing the impossibility of his position the Imam soon withdrew to the more fertile province of Begmeder. Upon arriving in Begmeder, the Imam pacified the people of Siemen and Dembiya. The Beta Israel assisted the Adalites in subduing the Christians and the establishments on the islands of Lake Tana were looted and destroyed. In 1536 the Adalites invaded Gojjam, to the south of Lake Tana, and massacred the people there. The next year the Imam went to Dawaro and stayed there for eight months, and then went on to Angot. The Emperor was forced to live as an outlaw in his own realm constantly hounded by Imam Ahmed's soldiers the Malassay, Dawit then dispatched João Bermudes, who had arrived in Ethiopia with Dom Rodrigo de Lima, to reach out to the King of Portugal for military aid.

The King of Portugal would eventually send ships with 400 Portuguese musketeers, but when they arrived in 1541, Dawit II was dead and his son Gelawdewos had succeeded him. The Portuguese led by Cristóvão da Gama had arrived in Massawa where Bahr Negus Yeshaq was still holding out. They were soon met by the Queen Mother Seble Wongel and her followers. Reinforced by her local auxiliaries, together they advanced into Tigray where they defeated a local Adal garrison during the Battle of Baçente. The Imam then sent a messenger to Gama demanding that the Portuguese force either leave Ethiopia, join the Imam, or be destroyed. On the Imam's orders, the messenger produced the gift of a monk's habit, an expensive insult to Gama. Gama responded with his own messenger, who delivered "a few lines in Arabic", stating that he had come to Ethiopia "by order of the great Lion of the Sea" and on the "following day he [Ahmad] would see what the Portuguese were worth", and delivered Gama's own insulting gift: a pair of "small tweezers for the eyebrows, and a very large mirror – making him out [to be] a woman." The first encounter took place during the Battle of Jarte, da Gama formed his troops into an infantry square and marched against the Imam's lines, repelling successive waves of Adalite attacks with musket and cannon. This battle ended when Imam Ahmad was wounded in the leg by a chance shot; seeing his banners signal retreat, the Portuguese and their Abyssinian allies fell upon them, inflicting immense losses on the Adalites. Over the next several days, Imam Ahmad's forces were reinforced by arrivals of fresh troops. Understanding the need to act swiftly, da Gama on 16 April again formed a square which he led against Imam Ahmad's camp. Castanhoso laments that "the victory would have been complete this day had we only one hundred horses to finish it, for the King was carried on men's shoulders in a bed, accompanied by horsemen, and they fled in no order." Da Gama marched southward after Imam Ahmad's force, coming within sight of him ten days later. However, the onset of the rainy season prevented da Gama from engaging Ahmad. On the advice of Queen Seble Wongel, da Gama made winter camp at Wofla near Lake Ashenge, still within sight of his opponent. Ahmad was forced to retreat further south, where with fortune against him, the local population now openly defied him by refusing to provide him supplies or soldiers. J. Spencer Trimingham identifies the Imam's refuge near a village named Kobo overlooking the Afar Depression.

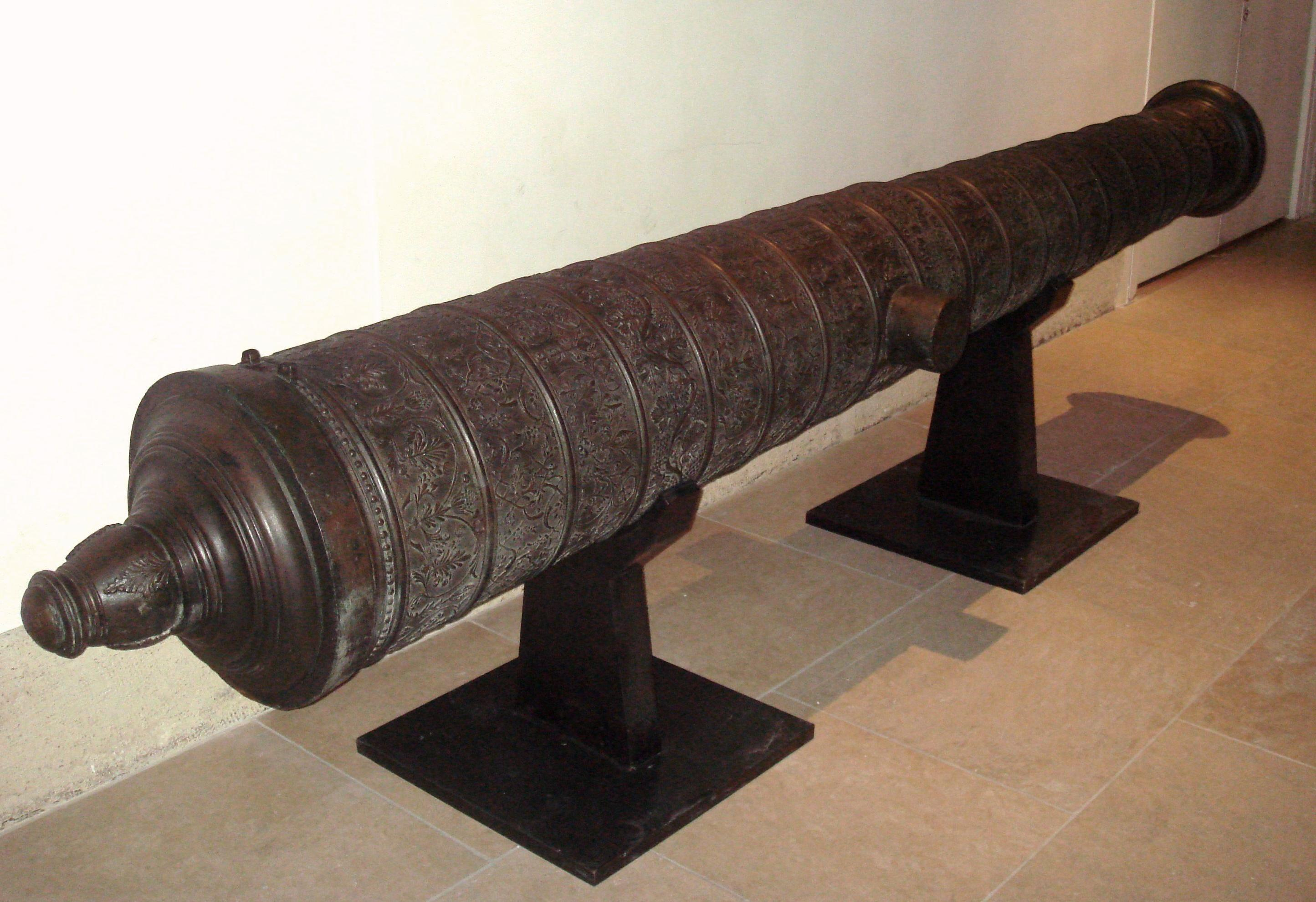
Ahmad ibn Ibrahim al-Ghazi's pioneering use of cannons figured in his conquest of Ethiopian territories.

The Imam successfully petitioned to the Turkish governor of Yemen Eyalet in Zabid, offering "much money" and submission to the official, he received an additional 2,000 musketeers from Arabia, and artillery and 900 picked men from the Ottomans to assist him. Meanwhile, due to casualties and other duties, da Gama's force was reduced to 300 musketeers. After the rains ended, Imam Ahmad attacked the Portuguese camp at Wolfa and through weight of numbers killed all but 140 of da Gama's troops. Da Gama himself, badly wounded, was captured with ten of his men and, after refusing an offer to spare his life if he would convert to Islam, was tortured and executed.

The Imam was certain that the surviving Portuguese were scattered, without their firearms, and alone in a foreign land, he concluded that this threat was ended, dismissed all but two hundred of the foreign musketeers, and proceeded to his camp at Derasge on the shores of Lake Tana. However, the Portuguese had regrouped and joined Queen Seble Wongel, who had taken refuge at the "Mountain of the Jews", which Whiteway identifies as Amba Sel. Ten days later her son, Emperor Gelawdewos had arrived. Castanhoso states that after the Emperor Gelawdewos had joined the survivors, and seeing the number of men who flocked to the Emperor's standard, at Christmas "we went to the Preste, and begged him to help us avenge the death of Dom Christovão." Gelawdewos agreed to march against the Imam. The Portuguese firearms which had been stored at Debre Damo were produced. The allied forces spent the following months arming their troops before heading to Imam Ahmad's camp next to Lake Tana. On 13 February 1543, they defeated a group of cavalry and infantry led by the Imam's lieutenant Sayid Mehmed in Wogera, killing Sayid Mehmed. From the prisoners it was learned that the Imam was camped only 5 days' march away at Deresgue, and flush with victory the army marched to confront their enemy. The Imam and his men were apparently stunned that the Portuguese had managed to reassemble and were looking for battle, according to Castanhoso this demoralized the Adalites and put fear into their hearts as "they understood well that we had only come to avenge the past".

The Abyssinians and Portuguese met Ahmad on 21 February 1543 in the Battle of Wayna Daga. The Imam had an army of over 15,000 soldiers including 200 Turkish musketeers, where as the Abyssinians and Portuguese had a combined force of around 8,000 men. The Abyssinians charged but the Adalites counterattacked and seemed to be pushing back the initial assault. The Abyssinian cavalry then threw themselves vigorously into the Adal lines which pushed the Adalites back. The Imam seeing his men lose ground moved up to encourage them, it was here that the Imam was killed while attempting to rally his men, although the sources differ in how he died. Sixteenth century Ottoman Egyptian writer al-Jazīrī, however states that Khalid a renegade Adalite knew the imam Garad Ahmed personally and was able to identify his body on the battleground. Upon seeing the death of the Imam, his followers had begun to flee from the battlefield. What followed was a devastating rout as the Abyssinians pursued the fleeing Adalites and cut them down as they ran.

The Imam's wife Bati del Wambara managed to escape the battlefield with the remnants of the army and retreated back to Harar, abandoning the occupation of Abyssinia. The corpse of the Imam was beheaded and Gelawdewos ordered his head to be set on a spear, and carried around in all of Abyssinia, so that the people know that the conqueror who had wrought them such evils was indeed dead. The Abyssinians then set up great festivals across the country celebrating the death of the Imam, as Castanhoso narrates "We remained in great pleasure, seeing each day the Abyssinians delighting in that victory, and in the liberty in which they found themselves."

Ottoman chancery copy of Sultan Suleiman the Magnificent’s letter to Imām Aḥmad, sending him praises and recognising him as “ruler of Ḥabasha” c. 1541

== Character ==
Muslim sources paint the Imam as an ascetic and a model Mujahid. Shihab al-Din notes that during a campaign in Gendebelo he rejected the inhabitants offers of gold for his wife and rebuked the protests of his top lieutenants insisting that the gold was to be used only for the jihad.

Soon after assuming power in 1527 he forbade wine, gambling, and dances accompanied by drums. He also was known to patronize jurists and theologians. Shihab al-Din mentions that he built many mosques and towns in Begemder and Dembiya during his conquest of Tigre. He was also very zealous in converting the Abyssinian population as he personally taught the Quran to the converted and above all children. During his invasion in 1535 the Imam visited the tomb of Najashi in Negash to pay his respects as well as naming his son Ahmed Al Najashi after him.

== Legacy ==
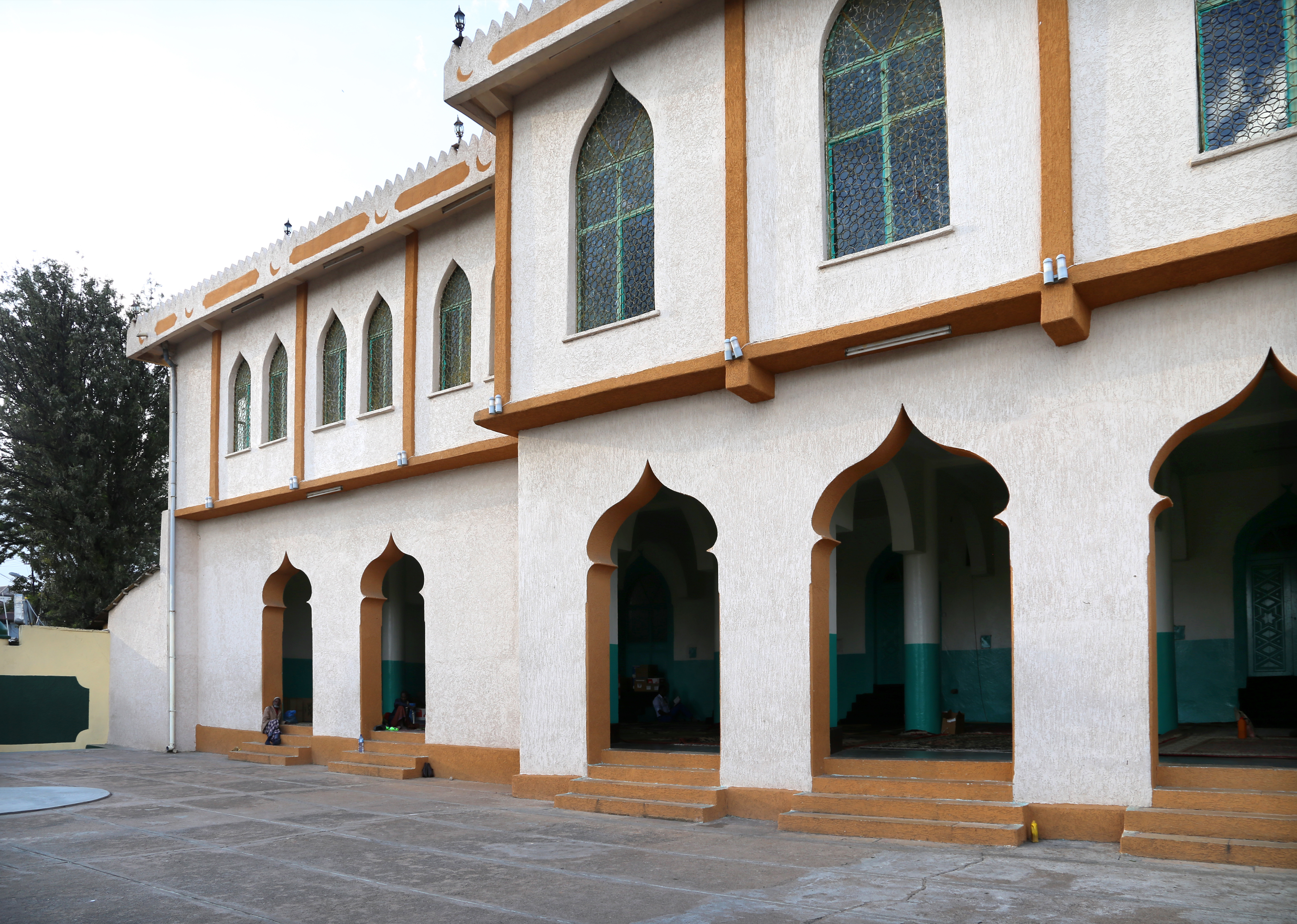
Jami mosque in Harar, the location of Ahmed ibn Ibrahim's gravestone

Imam Ahmad's invasion was arguably the single most important chapter in Ethiopia's long history. The destruction of cultural assets and national pride was immense. Imam Ahmad's invasion left an indelible mark on the Ethiopian psyche. As Paul B. Henze writes, "In Ethiopia the damage which Ahmad Gragn did has never been forgotten. Every Christian highlander still hears tales of Gragn in his childhood." Haile Selassie referred to him in his memoirs: "I have often had villagers in northern Ethiopia point out sites of towns, forts, churches and monasteries destroyed by Gragn as if these catastrophes had occurred only yesterday." Shewan folklore portrays Imam Ahmed as a giant of mythical stature who was only halted by 500 men, on 500 horses, with 500 rifle shots. Ethiopian chronicles claim that 90% of the Empire was islamized during his conquests. According to Enrico Cerulli, Adal would never recover from the death of Imam Ahmad as the Sultanate of Adal was too newly established to transcend tribal differences. His successors were unable to exert their authority over the nomadic tribes and the Adalite state became mostly centered around the city of Harar. The result he claims was that the nomadic people instinctively return to their "eternal disintegrating struggles of people against people and tribe against tribe." By 1577 the Adal Sultanate would eventually disintegrate due to tribal infighting and pressure from the Oromo migrations.

The Shawwal Eid festival in Harar, which was added to the UNESCO list of intangible cultural heritage in 2023, is associated with Ahmed Ibrahim.

Historian Didier Morin states Ahmed Ibrahim who holds the title Imam is often incorrectly identified with commander Ahmed Girri al-Somali.

== See also ==
- Imam Ahmed Stadium
- Adal Sultanate
- History of Somalia
- History of Ethiopia
