= Abu Bakr ibn Muhammad =

Abū Bakr ibn Muḥammad أبو بكر بن محمد
- Sultan

Sultan of the Adal Sultanate
- Reign: 1525–1526
- Predecessor: Garad Abun Adashe (1518–1520)
- Successor: Ahmad ibn Ibrahim al-Ghazi (1526-1547); Umar Din (puppet ruler)
- Dynasty: Walashmaʿ dynasty
- Religion: Islam

Abū Bakr ibn Muḥammad (Arabic: أبو بكر بن محمد), (reigned 1525–1526), was a Sultan of the Adal Sultanate in the Horn of Africa. The historian Richard Pankhurst credits Abu Bakr with founding the city of Harar, which he made his military headquarters in 1520. According to Donald Levine, He was of Harari background, and was assassinated by Ahmed ibn Ibrahim al-Ghazi

== Reign ==
Abu Bakr organized a band of Somali brigands, then attacked the popular leader of Adal emir Garad Abogn ibn Adish and killed him subsequently moving the capital of Adal Sultanate to Harar city. However, a power struggle with Imam Ahmad ibn Ibrahim al-Ghazi would ensue, who eventually defeated Abu Bakr and killed him. The Imam then made Abu Bakr's younger brother, Umar Din, the new sultan, although the latter only reigned as a puppet king.

== See also ==
- Walashmaʿ dynasty
- Siege of Hubat

== Notes ==
=== Works cited ===
- Spencer Trimingham, John (1952). Islam in Ethiopia. Oxford: Oxford University Press. OCLC 458382994.
- Tamrat, Taddesse (1977). "Ethiopia, the Red Sea and the Horn". In Oliver, Roland (ed.). The Cambridge History of Africa. Volume 3: from c. 1050 to c. 1600. Cambridge: Cambridge University Press. pp. 98–182. ISBN 978-0-521-20981-6.
