= Battle of Amba Sel =

1531 battle of the Ethiopian-Adal War

- Part of the Ethiopian–Adal War
| Date | 28 October 1531 |
| Location | Ambassel, Ethiopia |
| Result | Adalite victory |

Belligerents
| Ethiopian Empire | Adal Sultanate |

Commanders and leaders
| (Ethiopian Empire) Dawit II | (Adal Sultanate) Ahmad ibn Ibrahim (Adal Sultanate) Garad Matan † |

Strength
| 40,000 | 35,000 |

Casualties and losses
| 8,000 | 2,500 |

The Battle of Amba Sel was fought on 28 October 1531, between the Ethiopians under their Emperor Dawit II, and the forces of Imam Ahmad ibn Ibrahim al-Ghazi of the Adal Sultanate.

== Sources ==
- Sheppard, Si (2025). Crescent Dawn: The Rise of the Ottoman Empire and the Making of the Modern Age. Great Britain: Osprey Publishing. ISBN 9781472851468.
