= J. Spencer Trimingham =

Islamic scholar (1904–1987)

- Born: John Spencer Trimingham; 17 November 1904; Thorne
- Died: 6 March 1987 (aged 82); Lingfield
- Education: Birmingham University, Oxford University, Wells Theological College
- Occupation: scholar
- Writing career
- Notable work: The Sufi orders in Islam

John Spencer Trimingham (17 November 1904 – 6 March 1987) was a noted English 20th-century scholar on Islam in Africa. Trimingham was born in Thorne to John William Trimingham and Alice Ventress. In 1932, Trimingham married Wardeh in Jerusalem. Wardeh later died in 1980.

Trimingham studied social sciences at Birmingham University, Arabic and Persian at Oxford University, and trained for the ministry of the Church of England at Wells Theological College. He served with the Church Missionary Society in the Sudan, Egypt, and West Africa (1937–1953) and travelled extensively carrying out detailed studies of Islam in Africa. He first published on Arabic and on the Christian approach to Islam, later on the history of Islam in Africa and Sufi orders. Subsequently, he was reader in Arabic and head of the Department of Arabic and Islamic Studies at Glasgow University (1953–1964) and a visiting professor in the department of history at the American University of Beirut (1964–1970). He then moved to the faculty of the Near East School of Theology in Beirut.

Triminghan died in 1987 in Lingfield.

== Works ==
- Sudan colloquial Arabic. 2nd. rev. ed., London, 1946
- The Christian approach to Islam in the Sudan. London, Oxford University Press, 1948
- Islam in the Sudan. London, Oxford University Press, 1949
- Islam in Ethiopia. London, Oxford University Press, 1952
- Islam in West Africa. Oxford, Clarendon Press, 1959
- A history of Islam in West Africa. London, Oxford University Press, 1962
- Islam in East Africa. Oxford, Clarendon Press, 1964. (Repr. New York, 1980: ISBN 0836992709)
- The influence of Islam upon Africa. London, Longmans, 1968 (Second edition, 1980)
- The Sufi orders in Islam. Oxford, Clarendon Press, 1971. ISBN 0198265247 (Repr. 1998: ISBN 0-19-512058-2)
- Two worlds are ours. A study of time and eternity in relation to the Christian Gospel freed from the tyranny of the Old Testament reference. Beirut, Librairie du Liban, 1971
- Christianity among the Arabs in pre-Islamic times. London, Longman, 1979. ISBN 0582780810
