= Abun Adashe =

- Emir

Leader of Adal
- Reign: 1518-1525
- Predecessor: Muhammad ibn Azhar ad-Din
- Successor: Abu Bakr ibn Muhammad
- Religion: Islam

Garad Abun ibn Adash (Harari: አቦኝ ኣዲሽ) or Abogn ibn Adish was a Harari Emir of the Adal Sultanate. He was the de facto ruler of Adal reducing the Adal sultan to nominal leader. In this period Sultan Abu Bakr ibn Muhammad would move Adal's capital to Harar city after killing Emir Abun in order to regain influence in Adal.

== Reign ==
Garad Abogn ibn Adish ruled from 1518 to 1525 and led a campaign against the Walashma dynasty. Abogn campaigned against Sultan Abu Bakr ibn Muhammad; however he was decisively defeated at Harar his own base and Abu Bakr successfully invaded Harar with the assistance of Somali brigands. Imam Ahmad ibn Ibrahim Al-Ghazi served as an advisor and respected infantryman for Abogn against the Walashma forces. After his loss, Imam Ahmed avenged his death and killed Abu Bakr. He was described in the works of Arab Faqih as having clung to the truth, and exercised justice and authority in a fairway, banning what was forbidden in the Sharia, killing highwaymen, forbidding wine, games, and dances accompanied by drums. The country flourished as he cultivated the nobles and the Qur’anic teachers, the dervishes and the sheikhs. He ruled over his kingdom, and worked for the good of his subjects.

== See also ==
- Walashma dynasty
- Garad
