= Timeline of the Ethiopian Empire =

This is chronological list about the Ethiopian Empire, an empire dominated the present-day Ethiopia and Eritrea from the beginning of establishment of Solomonic dynasty by Emperor Yekuno Amlak in 1270 to fall of monarchy on 21 March 1975 under Haile Selassie.

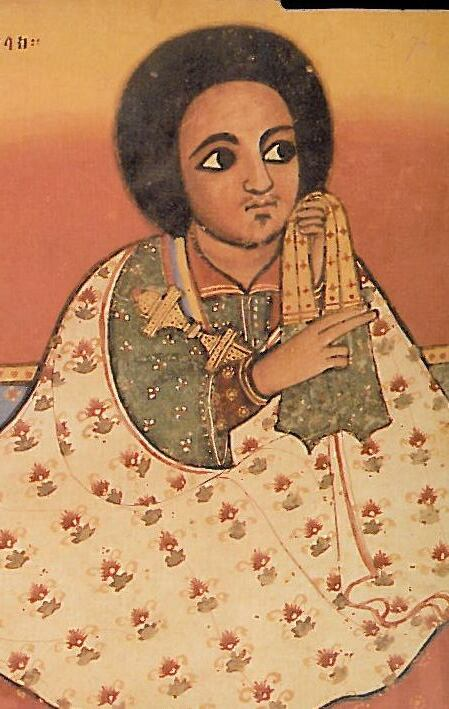
Yekuno Amlak in portrait, the founder of the Empire

== Early history ==
- 1270 – Battle of Ansata, a war between Solomonic dynasty led by Yekuno Amlak and Zagwe dynasty led by Yetbarak.
- 1270 – Ascension of Yekuno Amlak as Emperor of Ethiopia, inaugurating the Solomonic dynasty and the Ethiopian Empire (also known as Abyssinia).
- 1279 – the deposed Sultan of Shewa Dil Marrah successfully appealed to Yekuno Amlak to restore his rule.

== Under Amda Seyon ==
- 1314 – Amda Seyon reigned as Emperor of Ethiopia.
- 1316/17 – Amda Seyon made campaign to the south. The Tigray Enderta Province gained independence since Yekuno Amlak.
- 1328 – Amda Seyon appointed Bahr Seged as governor and given to control maritime provinces under the title Ma'ikele Bahr ("Between the Rivers/Seas").
- 1321–1322 – Amda Seyon threatened to retaliate Muslims in his kingdom after persecution of Copts by Sultan an-Nasir Muhammad of the Mamluk Sultanate.
- 1329 – Amda Seyon campaigned vast provinces in northern region, including Semien, Wegera, Tselemt, and Tsegede, in which many have been converting to Judaism and where the Beta Israel had been gaining prominence.
- 1332 – Sabr ad-Din rebel against the Christian kingdom and seen as an act of jihad than attempt to independence.

== Conflicts with Muslim states ==
- 1376 – Sultan Sa'ad ad-Din Abdul Muhammad succeeded his brother and came to power, attacked Abyssinian Christian army.
- 1403 – Ifat troops were defeated on the Harar plateau.
- 1415 – Adal Sultanate was established.
- 1428 – Yeshaq I sent two emissaries to Alfonso V of Aragon.
- 1508 – Continuous foreign relations began under the reign of Dawit II.

== Ethiopian–Adal War ==
- 1529 – Beginning of Ethiopian–Adal War, Battle of Shimbra Kure.
- 1531 – Adal Sultanate led by general imam Ahmed penetrated the Ethiopian Empire at Antukyah.
- 28 October 1531 – Battle of Amba Sel, the Adal troops overwhelmed the Ethiopian soldiers, entering the Ethiopian Highlands and subsequent sack began.
- 2 September 1540 – Dawit II death and his son Gelawdewos became Emperor.
- 21 February 1543 – Abyssinians led by Emperor Gelawdewos defeated the Adal Sultanate and killed Imam Ahmed.
- 1555 – the Jesuits influence to Ethiopia began.
- 1557 – the Ottoman Empire took Massawa and established Habesh Eyalet from province of Abyssinia.
- 1573 – the Sultanate of Harar attempted to invaded Ethiopia again despite Sarsa Dengel defended the Ethiopian frontier.
- 1589 – the Ottomans sacked Arqiqo in Eritrea, thus containing them on narrow strip.

== Early modern period ==
- 16th century – Oromo migrations began to northern region of Ethiopia.
- 1622 – Roman Catholicism became state religion to the Empire under Emperor Susenyos I by pressure of Jesuits.
- 1632 – Orthodox Tewahedo reinstated to state religion by the order of Emperor Fasilides, beginning with Gondarine period.
- 1636 – Founding of Gondar as capital of the Empire and subsequent Ethiopian Renaissance flourished.
- 1706 – Gondar's power was decayed following the death of Emperor Iyasu I due to most emperors preferred to enjoy luxurious life rather than spending in politics.
- 1755 – after the death of Iyasu II, Empress Mentewab brought her brother, Ras Wolde Leul, to Gondar made him Ras Bitwaded. It is asserted that this time was Zemene Mesafint (Era of the Princes).
- 1769 – Iyoas I was killed by Ras Mikael Sehul and installed Yohannes II as Emperor of Ethiopia. It is widely considered the beginning of Zemene Mesafint.

== Modern period ==
- 12 April 1853 – Battle of Takusa, a war between the forces of Kassa Hailu, future Emperor of Ethiopia and several rival warlords of the era.
- 11 February 1855 – Ascension of Emperor Tewodros II, ending the Zemene Mesafint.
- 13 April 1868 – Tewodros committed suicide at Magdala following the British Expedition of Abyssinia.
- 1874 – Ethiopian–Egyptian War began between the Ethiopian Empire and Khedivate of Egypt, a vassal state of the Ottoman Empire.
- 1878 – Menelik's Expansions began.
- 5 July 1882 – The Italian enterprises led by Giuseppe Sapeto took Assab.
- 3 June 1884 – Hewett Treaty signed between Ethiopia, Egypt and Britain.
- 1887–1889 – Italo-Ethiopian War began.
- 2 March 1889 – Menelik II reigned as Emperor of Ethiopia.
- 2 May 1889 – Treaty of Wuchale signed between Ethiopia and Italy over Italian occupation of Eritrea.
- 1895–1896 – First Italo-Ethiopian War began originated from disputed Treaty of Wuchale.
  - 1 March 1896 – Battle of Adwa, the Kingdom of Italy defeated as Ethiopians were numerically superior, better equipped by Russia and France.

=== 20th century ===
- 10 July 1900 – Italy signed treaty with Ethiopia to demarcate the border between Ethiopia and Italian colony of Eritrea.
- 1907–1908 – Formation of modern border of Ethiopia completed with demarcation of British Somaliland, British Kenya and Italian Eritrea.
- 27 October 1916 – Battle of Segale began between Loyalists of Zewditu, Empress of Ethiopia, and Lij Iyasu.
- 1916 – Modernization under Haile Selassie
- 2 April 1930 – Haile Selassie reigned as Emperor of Ethiopia.
- 16 July 1931 – the first Constitution was promulgated with an emulation from 1890 Imperial Japan 1890 Constitution.
- 3 October 1935 – Second Italo-Ethiopian War began with Italy's invasion of Ethiopia commanded by Marshal Emilio De Bono.
- 1935 – Haile Selassie exiled to England in Fairfield House, Bath, made him 1935 Time Man of the Year.
- 9 May 1936 – Mussolini proclaims Italian Ethiopia with the assumption of the imperial title by the Italian King Vittorio Emanuele III.
- 9 June 1936 – Ethiopia was annexed as Italian East Africa
- 19 February 1937 – Yekatit 12 massacre took place in Addis Ababa, resulted in 1,400 and 30,000 civilians" deaths and many other imprisonments. This massacre was a reprisal for the attempted assassination of Rodolfo Graziani, the viceroy of Italian East Africa.
- 20 January 1940 – the British launched invasion to East Africa and subsequent military occupation of Ethiopia.
- 5 May 1941 – Haile Selassie returned to the throne to Ethiopia to help rally resistance.
- 19 May 1941 – British military occupation of Eritrea began.
- 31 January 1942 – 1st Anglo-Ethiopian Agreement.
- 19 December 1944 – 2nd Anglo-Ethiopian Agreement.
- 10 February 1947 – Italy recognized Ethiopian sovereignty.
- 15 September 1952 – End of British occupation, and with Eritrea federated to Ethiopia.
- 13–17 December 1960 – the 1960 Ethiopian coup d'état attempt took place against Haile Selassie.
- 1 September 1961 – Eritrean War of Independence began.
- 15 November 1962 – Eritrea withdrew from provincial division of Ethiopia.
- 1973 – 1973 oil crisis and Wollo famine began.
- 12 September 1974 – the Derg deposed and imprisoned Haile Selassie and chose General Aman Andom to be head of state.
- 21 March 1975 – Monarchy abolished.
- 27 August 1975 – Death of Haile Selassie.
