= Takla Iyasus =

General in the Ethiopian Empire

Ras Takla Iyasus
- ተክለ ኢየሱስ

Governor of Tigre
- In office Early 1520s – 13 April 1531
- Preceded by: unknown, probably Akhadom
- Succeeded by: Vizier Addoli as Adalite Supreme Commander of Northern Ethiopia

Governor of Angot
- In office Unknown–1531
- Preceded by: Unknown
- Succeeded by: Farshaham Ali as Adalite Governor of Angot

Lord of Dokono
- In office 1529–1531
- Preceded by: Za Wengel
- Succeeded by: Sharif Nur as Adalite Governor of Dokono

Personal details
- Born: c. 15th century Ethiopian Empire
- Died: April 13, 1531 Zari, Fatagar, Ethiopian Empire

Military service
- Allegiance: Ethiopian Empire
- Rank: Azmach
- Battles/wars: Ethiopian–Adal War: Battle of Shimbra Kure; Battle of Zari

Takla Iyasus (Amharic: ተክለ ኢየሱስ) was a general and nobleman in the Ethiopian Empire under Lebna Dengel who served as governor of Angot, Tigre, and the port of Dokono during the Ethiopian-Adal War.

== Biography ==
Takla Iyasus served as the commander of the Tigrayan forces during The Battle of Shimbra Kure where they faced numerous casualties including loss of 10,000 archers, countless infantrymen, and numerous Azmachs. Despite this however Iyasus was rewarded with the fiefdom of Dokono and it's prosperous seaport after the battle due to his high rank in court and personal relationship with Lebna Dengel. The port had previously belonged to Medri Bahri under the Bahr Negash Za Wengel who was slain during Shimbra Kure. After the Ethiopian defeat at Antukyah an infuriated Lebna Dengel, sent Iyasus to replace Ras Eslamu's as Commander-in-chief of the army in Fatagar along with reinforcements for Angot and Tigre. As he got to Fatagar Iyasus choose to camp at Zari, an inaccessible locality near Ayfars, but was however betrayed by local Crypto Muslims who lead Imam Ahmed Gurey to the location catching the Ethiopian force off guard. In the ensuing battle was killed and beheaded by a Muslim cavalryman by the name of Adish bin Mahi. His son Kefle who served as governor of Qeda was also captured during the battle. His other son, Saul, was executed by the Imam in Simien in 1535.
