= Battle of Zari =

1531 battle of Ethiopia–Adal War

- Part of the Ethiopian–Adal War
Date	13 April 1531
Location	Zari, Fatagar, Ethiopia
Result	Adalite victory
Territorial changes	Ethiopian withdrawal from Ifat, Fatagar, and Shewa

Belligerents
Adal Sultanate	Ethiopian Empire

Commanders and leaders
(Adal Sultanate) Ahmad ibn Ibrahim (Adal Sultanate) Garad Hirabu (Adal Sultanate) Abu Bakr Qecchin	Takla Iyasus †; Eslamu †

Strength
Unknown	Unknown

Casualties and losses
Minimal	All but 20 killed

The Battle of Zari was fought in 1531 between Adal Sultanate forces under Imam Ahmad ibn Ibrahim al-Ghazi and the Abyssinian army under Takla Iyasus. Ethiopian chronicles mention this battle as the Battle of Ayfars.

After the Christian defeat at the Battle of Antukyah, Eslamu fled to Zari where he received orders from the Emperor Lebna Dengel demoting him and placed him under the command of Takla Iyasus, the Governor of Angot. However, when Iyasus arrived in Zari, Eslamu's forces were largely reduced by desertations as well as from casualties at Antukyah. At Zari, the Muslims were able to catch the Christian force off guard due to intelligence gathered from native Crypto Muslims. Both Eslamu and Takla Iyasus were slain by Garad Hirabu's men in the ensuing battle along with numerous Azmachs such as the governors of Begemder, Gojjam, and Hamasien. This devastating loss led to the complete withdrawal of the Ethiopians from the Shewan Plateau.
