= Battle of Badeqe =

1528 clash between Adal and Ethiopia

- Part of Ethiopian–Adal War
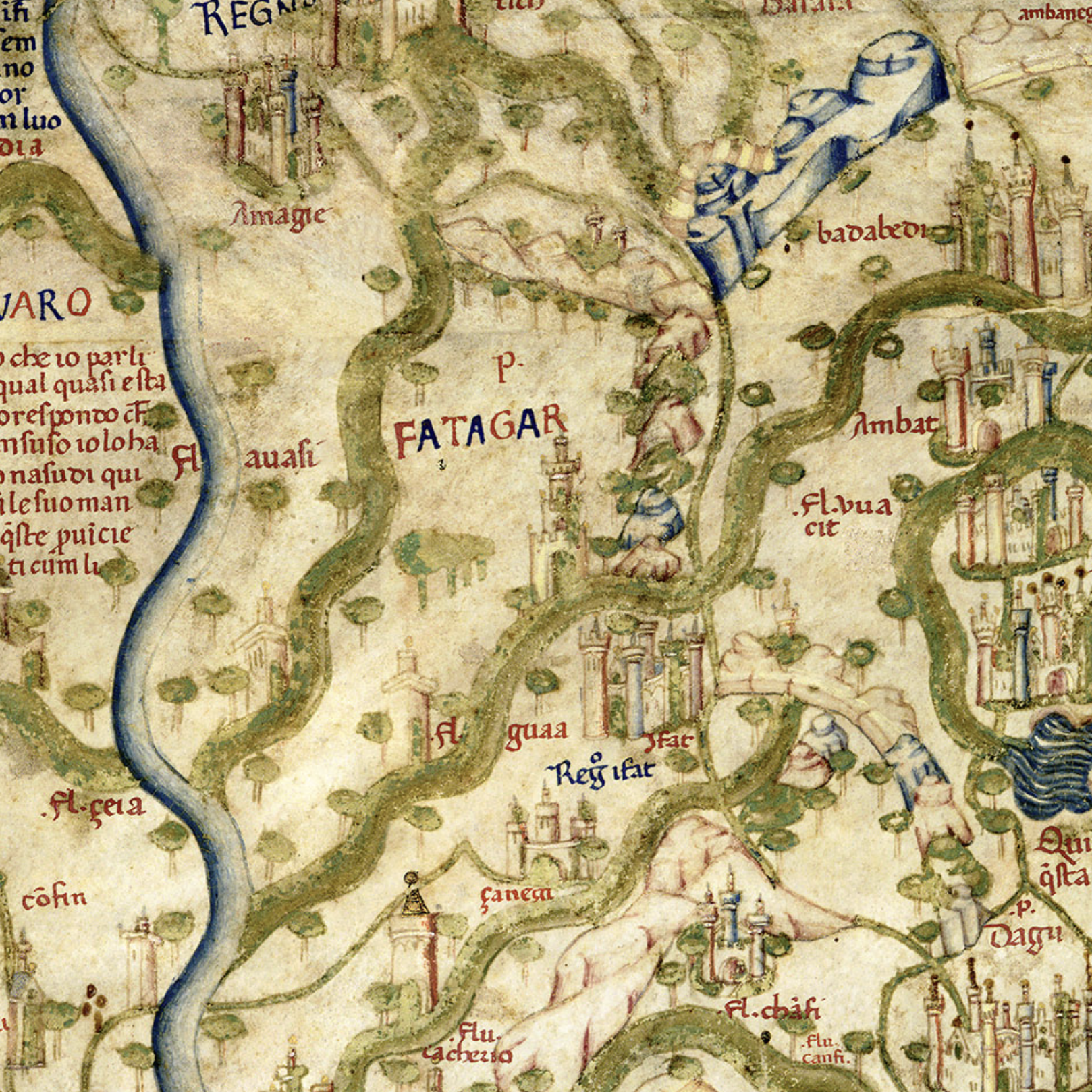
- The historical region of Fatagar depicted in Fra Mauro's world map c. 1450
Date	September 1528 (Mäskäräm 1521 A.M.) – Rajab 935 A.H.
Location	Badeqe, Fatagar, Ethiopian Empire
Result	Ethiopian victory: Adal assault on the royal town repulsed at the Samarma river

Belligerents
Adal Sultanate	Ethiopian Empire

Commanders and leaders
Imam Ahmad ibn Ibrahim al-Ghazi (Note: Ahmad's own contingent at Badeqe is described in the Futuh al-Habasha as including some two hundred elite horsemen; see § Prelude: the march to Badeqe.); Wazir 'Addoli; Mattan ibn 'Utman	Lebna Dengel; Patrician Ura'i 'Utman; Patrician Robel

Casualties and losses
Heavy	Minimal

Battle of Badeqe (also rendered Bādaqī) was a series of clashes fought in and around the Ethiopian royal town of Badeqe, in the historical province of Fatagar, in September 1528. It pitted a raiding army of the Muslim Adal Sultanate, led by Imam Ahmad ibn Ibrahim al-Ghazi, against a regional Ethiopian Christian force mobilized by the emperor Lebna Dengel.

The fighting is the earliest named battle described in detail in the Futuh al-Habasha ("Conquest of Abyssinia"), the Arabic chronicle of the war written by the imam's companion Shihab al-Din Ahmad ibn 'Abd al-Qadir, known as Arab Faqih. It came roughly six months before the two rulers met in person for the first time at the decisive Battle of Shimbra Kure in March 1529.

== Background ==
By the mid-1520s the Adal Sultanate, based around Harar, was consolidating under the leadership of the young military commander and preacher Ahmad ibn Ibrahim al-Ghazi, who had risen to prominence following the death in 1516 of the sultanate's previous strongman, Mahfuz, at Ethiopian hands after Mahfuz had spent some twenty-four years raiding Dawaro, Fatagar and Waj, and the subsequent civil war within Adal. Christian Ethiopian chronicles record an early clash in 1527, when Lebna Dengel sent his brother-in-law Dagalhan on a raid into Adal border territory; the Futuh al-Habasha describes this and a following Muslim counter-raid, after which Ahmad organised the first of a series of larger expeditions against the Ethiopian borderlands, beginning with a raid into the Dawaro and Ifat districts.

Further names of individuals in both camps involved in the initial raids are provided by Mekuria in his account: first of all, a defeat inflicted by the ruler of Dawaro, Fanuel, on Ahmad some four years prior to the main campaign, then battles in which Wazir 'Addoli and Emir Mansur ibn Mahfuz attacked towards Dawaro and farther on, as well as when Arba Shimel and Wanag Zan, the Ethiopian and Ifat commanders respectively, were killed, and Emir Mujahid became one of the most valiant of Ahmad's field commanders. As for factionalism in the Ethiopian court during these years, Merid Wolde Aregay, again cautiously, suggests that the deaths of the two regents, Eleni and Naod Mogesa, were followed by a purge of their old favourites, and that Robel and Dagalhan were possible leaders of the faction that benefited from it, though he stresses that its actual composition cannot really be established from the available sources.

The second of these expeditions was specifically directed against Fatagar and against Badeqe, the royal town where Lebna Dengel had been born and which then served as one of his residences. This was the case since Fatagar had long served this purpose; located on the northern bank of the Awash in south-eastern Shewa, it had earlier seen fifteenth-century emperors such as Zara Yaqob and Eskender born or raised at another royal residence in the same province, known as Télq. Arab Faqih states that in response to the advisers of the imam observing that no Adal leader had ever dared to attack the Ethiopian king "in his own country," rather than raiding the frontier and withdrawing afterwards according to tradition, Ahmad pressed on with the campaign.

According to Amélie Chekroun, this particular expedition, which she dates to roughly a year from the army's departure from Harar to its return, was of a completely different nature from both the raids that preceded and followed it: it targeted the royal residence directly, its language leaned more heavily on jihad and martyrdom, and its spoils consisted strictly of battlefield war-spoils such as horses, armour, and weapons, rather than the herds and civilian property seized in ordinary border raids.

== Prelude: the march to Badeqe ==
The Adal army mustered at Harar and marched by way of Zifah, where the imam's wife Bati del Wambara gave birth to a son, Muhammad, and on to a river called Dir, where the various contingents converged. Mekuria adds that Bati del Wambara, though her time was near, refused to wait behind in Harar and insisted on travelling with the army as far as Zifah, where she remained with the imam's sister for the birth. At Baqal-Zar the imam organised his forces under their standards: a Somali contingent under his brother-in-law Mattan, another wing under the wazir Nur bin Ibrahim, and the central force, including some two hundred elite horsemen, under Ahmad himself, with the wazir 'Addoli commanding the vanguard.

News of the invasion reached Lebna Dengel at Badeqe. He withdrew to the dynastic seat of Bet Amhara to summon the full imperial levy, while the forces stationed at Badeqe were entrusted to the patrician Ura'i 'Utman, described by Mekuria as a former Muslim convert to Christianity and the governor of Fatagar. As word of the attack spread, soldiers from Tigray, Dawaro, Bali, Fatagar, Damot, and elsewhere converged on the town; according to Mekuria, the new arrivals included Bitwedded Serse, holding a rank equal to Dagalhan's, the Dawaro governor Hidug Ras Mahsento (successor to a Ras Nebiyat), and the Tigray governor Takla Iyasus, though Mekuria adds that no source clearly states whether any of them, or all together, held overall command of the defence. Takla Iyasus's own tenure as Tigray's governor had begun only recently: Lebna Dengel had appointed the experienced lord Robel to the post at the end of 1524 but replaced him by 1527 or 1528, yet the Futuh al-Habasha still recognizes Robel, not his successor, as the de facto leader of the Tigrayan lords who fought in the battle.

This royal church was thus an important rallying point for the town's defenders, for it had been built by Lebna Dengel's mother, Empress Naod Mogesa of Tigray, said to have been instrumental in establishing it along with two other royal churches elsewhere in the kingdom. The Tigrayan origin of the empress may have been a factor in why the Tigrayan defenders in particular insisted the church be spared from fire. In his French translation of the Futuh al-Habasha, Basset mistakenly equated the "mother of the king" with the regent queen Eleni, when she should have been identified as Naod Mogesa, an error since corrected in the Encyclopaedia Aethiopica. In any case, this church at Badeqe would have stood for quite some time by the time it came under attack, since Naod Mogesa had served for years on the regency council alongside Eleni, and both women died within a year or two of each other, sometime between 1521 and 1523, well before the 1528 campaign; her father had been governor of Bahr Negash.

The Adal army, meanwhile, advanced through Amajah (where local Muslim residents warned the imam of the scale of the forces being gathered against him), Jan Zalaq, where a small Adal detachment defeated an Ethiopian patrol on Mount Kassani, and on through Mesk and the Maju river in Fatagar, burning outlying villages and at least one other church along the way.

== The battle ==
It was on the third day after leaving Jan Zalaq that the Adal army approached Badeqe. Having learnt that no troops remained to defend it, the Muslim invaders began entering the town in disarray, many of them dismounting from their war-horses to ride mules instead. It was then that the main Ethiopian force, commanded by Ura'i 'Utman, Maha Tenta (Note: The figure named "Maha Tenta" in Stenhouse and Pankhurst's translation, styled "Dawaro Nagas", corresponds closely enough in name and role to the "Hidug Ras Mahsento" named by Mekuria as governor of Dawaro that this article treats them as the same person; the identification is inferred rather than stated outright in either source.) ("Dawaro Nagas"), and Takla Iyasus, governor of Tigray, together with a separate contingent of Tigrayan patricians led by Robel, Aser, Feqra Iyesus, Wasu 'Utman, and Aron, moved to intercept them before they could set fire to the town and its church.

There was controversy among the Ethiopian commanders about timing, because some patricians, in accordance with the king's orders, wanted to wait until the Muslims had entered the town and started setting fires, so that the attack would be justified. Robel and the Tigrayan patricians, however, crossed the river separating the two camps, the Samarma (also given elsewhere in the chronicle as the Dukam, a tributary of the Awash), and attacked at once. The rationale behind Robel's decision is given by Mekuria in the words of the Tigrayan officers themselves: as long as they were alive, the royal palace and "their sister's church" would not be burnt.

In the fighting that followed, the vanguard commanded by the wazir 'Addoli was initially driven back across the river, with several named Adal fighters killed, among them a foot-soldier commander, Del Sabbar, and the horsemen Marfu, Nasr bin Adam and as-Saddiq, and two prominent commanders, Abu Bakr "Qatin" and Kusem Abu Bakr, wounded; a number of retreating Muslims drowned attempting to re-cross the river. Ahmad rallied the fleeing soldiers in person, pitched his tent, and reorganised the army into three columns to force three separate river crossings: the right under Mattan, the centre under himself, and the left under 'Addoli. Before committing to the crossing, Ahmad is said to have told his horsemen not to rush the ford but to first choose ground that favoured a cavalry fight.

The battle raged from midday till dusk around the crossing points. It is worth mentioning that the chronicle singles out Hamzah al-Jufi, a foot soldier who managed to repel the defenders again and again at the central crossing point. Archers of the Maya tribe, allies of the Ethiopians known for their use of poisoned arrows, inflicted losses on the Adal side on both flanks. Afterward, the Adal side is said to have collected the enemy's spent arrows from the battlefield, partly to prevent their reuse and partly, for lack of firewood, to burn as fuel.

== Aftermath ==
However, the battle resumed the following morning after part of the Adal forces tried to desert; Ahmad dispatched officers ahead to block the road and turn the deserters back by force, before restoring order and continuing the march. A separate Ethiopian contingent occupying high ground along the retreat route was surrounded and wiped out. A few days later, near Mount Zeqwala, a body of Maya archers marching to reinforce the king mistook the Adal camp for their own and were largely killed or captured. Lebna Dengel then arrived at Badeqe with the rest of his army, thanked the defenders for protecting his mother's church, and set out in pursuit of the withdrawing Adal army.

The pursuit led, roughly six months later, to the Battle of Shimbra Kure in March 1529, the first time Ahmad and Lebna Dengel met in person at the head of their armies

== See also ==
- Ethiopian–Adal War
- Battle of Shimbra Kure
- Battle of Hubat
- Ahmad ibn Ibrahim al-Ghazi
- Dawit II (Lebna Dengel)
- Futuh al-Habasha
- Fatagar

== Bibliography ==
- Aregay, Merid Wolde (1971). Southern Ethiopia and the Christian Kingdom, 1508–1708, with Special Reference to the Galla Migrations and their Consequences (PhD thesis). School of Oriental and African Studies, University of London.
- Basset, René (1897–1909). Basset, René (ed.). Histoire de la conquête de l'Abyssinie (XVIe siècle), par Chihab Eddin Ahmed ben 'Abd el-Qâder, surnommé Arab-Faqih. Publications de l'École des lettres d'Alger. Vol. 2 vols. Paris: Ernest Leroux.
- Chekroun, Amélie (2013). Le "Futuh al-Habasa" : écriture de l'histoire, guerre et société dans le Bar Sa'ad ad-din (Éthiopie, XVIe siècle) (PhD thesis). Université Paris 1 Panthéon-Sorbonne.
- Chekroun, Amélie; Hirsch, Bertrand (2020). "The Muslim-Christian Wars and the Oromo Expansion: Transformations at the End of the Middle Ages (c. 1500–c. 1560)". In Kelly, Samantha (ed.). A Companion to Medieval Ethiopia and Eritrea. Leiden/Boston: Brill. pp. 454–476.
- Derat, Marie-Laure (2005). "Fätägar". In Uhlig, Siegbert (ed.). Encyclopaedia Aethiopica. Vol. 2: D–Ha. Wiesbaden: Harrassowitz Verlag. s.v. "Fätägar".
- Derat, Marie-Laure (2007). "Naʿod Mogäsa". In Uhlig, Siegbert (ed.). Encyclopaedia Aethiopica. Vol. 3: He–N. Wiesbaden: Harrassowitz Verlag. s.v. "Naʿod Mogäsa".
- Kleiner, Michael (2010). "Täklä Iyäsus". In Uhlig, Siegbert; Bausi, Alessandro (eds.). Encyclopaedia Aethiopica. Vol. 4: O–X. Wiesbaden: Harrassowitz Verlag.
- Mekuria, Täklä Ṣadiq (1958). የኢትዮጵያ ታሪክ፡ ከዐፄ ልብነ ድንግል እስከ ዐፄ ቴዎድሮስ [History of Ethiopia: From Emperor Lebna Dengel to Emperor Tewodros] (in Amharic). Vol. Part 1. Addis Ababa: Tensae Zegubae Printing Press.
- Pankhurst, Richard (1997). The Ethiopian Borderlands: Essays in Regional History from Ancient Times to the End of the 18th Century. Lawrenceville, N.J.: Red Sea Press.
- Stenhouse, Paul Lester; Pankhurst, Richard (2003). Futuh al-Habasa: The Conquest of Abyssinia [16th Century]. translated by Paul Lester Stenhouse; annotated by Richard Pankhurst. Hollywood, CA: Tsehai Publishers & Distributors.
