= Robēl =

Ethiopian general and governor (died 1529)

Ras Robēl
- ሮቤል

Governor of Dawaro
- In office Unknown–1529
- Preceded by: Unknown
- Succeeded by: Husain Al Gaturi (as Adalite governor of Dawaro)

Personal details
- Born: 15th century
- Died: 9 March 1529 Shimbra Kure, Ethiopian Empire

Military service
- Allegiance: Ethiopian Empire
- Rank: Dejazmach
- Battles/wars: Ethiopian–Adal War: Battle of Shimbra Kure

Robēl (Ge'ez: ሮቤል; died 9 March 1529) was a general and governor in the Ethiopian Empire under Lebna Dengel. He was killed in The Battle of Shimbra Kure.

== Biography ==
A native of Tegre, little is known of Robēl's life before the Ethiopian-Adal War however Robēl is mentioned in Ethiopian sources as the governor of Dawaro and Amba Geshen while in Muslim sources he is simply referred to as a patrician from Tigray. He and his younger brother Aqba Mikā’īl were both killed in Shimbra Kure. The Muslim chronicler notes that Robēl was killed by an equerry of Imam Ahmad Gurey at Shimbra Kure, while his brother was killed by the Imam himself. His eldest son Amda Mikā’īl was killed by Abu Bakr Qecchin during the battle of Dakan Dur.
