= Nasir ibn Uthman =

Nasir ibn Uthman ناصر بن عثمان
- Sultan

Sultan of the Adal Sultanate
- Reign: 1571–1573
- Predecessor: Tahla Abbas
- Successor: Muhammad ibn Nasir
- Died: 1573
- Father: Uthman the Abyssinian
- Religion: Sunni Islam

Nasir ibn Uthman (Arabic: ناصر بن عثمان) was the sultan of the Sultanate of Adal in the Horn of Africa.

The son of Uthman the Abyssinian, Nasir was brought to power through a coup by a militaristic party who longed for a Second Conquest of Abyssinia. Upon his death in 1573, his son, Muhammad ibn Nasir ibn Uthman took his place followed him as sultan
