= Military of Adal =

Military unit in northeast Africa (1415–1577)

- سلطنة عدل
- Active: 1415-1577
- Disbanded: 1577
- Allegiance: Adal Sultanate
- Type: Land Force

The Military of Adal (Arabic: سلطنة عدال) was the core of the Adal Sultanate. The Sultanate’s Military is reported to have equipped a high level of discipline, strategic prowess and Organization, granting them successive victories in their various campaigns including the Conquest of Abyssinia. In its time in the 16th century, Adal Sultanates Military was a very powerful and an effective force.

== Historical Overview ==
In the 16th century the Adal Sultanate embarked on a Conquest of Abyssinia the troops were recruited from all over Adal.

== Weaponry ==
The Adal soldiers wore elaborate Domed helmets and steel armour made up of chain-mail with overlapping tiers. The Horsemen of Adal wore protective helmets that covered the entire face except for the eyes, and breastplates on their body, while they harnessed their horses in a similar fashion. In siege warfare, ladders were employed to scale buildings and other high positions such as hills and mountains.

== Malassay ==
Elite unit of military warriors in the Adal army was branded with the title Malassay or Malachai these were special adalite troops, The term often became synonymous with Muslims in Adal to outsiders, but it did not denote to a tribe, a Malasāy is not born He is given this title of malasai after demonstrating his military abilities in short you will have to qualify yourself into a malassay.

Arab faqih writes

Ten knights renowned for their courage, went on to the land of Sarkah Del Sagad, Takla, Ura'i Nür bin Där 'Ali, Abjad bin Abun, Garad Dawit al-Bartirri, Jinah Satut from the people of Sim, Yussef, Saidi Muhammad bin 'Ali al-Bagari whose father was an Arab - he had been the treasurer for the Imam, and was lord of Dawaro - and Abu Bakr bin Yamag Ahmad
