= Muhammad ibn Nasir =

Muhammad ibn Nasir محمد بن ناصر
- Sultan

Sultan of the Adal Sultanate
- Reign: 1573–1576
- Predecessor: Nasir ibn Uthman
- Successor: Mansur ibn Muhammad
- Died: 1576
- Father: Nasir ibn Uthman
- Religion: Sunni Islam

Muhammad ibn Nasir (Arabic: محمد بن ناصر), reigned 1573–1576, was a sultan of the Sultanate of Adal in the Horn of Africa.

== Reign ==
The son of Sultan Nasir ibn Uthman and the grandson of Uthman the Abyssinian. Muhammad ibn Nasir, desirous of resuming the old struggles against the Christian empire, relativized the administration of Adal, as a preparation for the grand plan. He made his brother Hamid, wazir of Harar. Haygan Hashim was made the governor of Aussa, while Hashim was made governor of Zeila. Sultan Muhammed is also credited with having commissioned the building of a wall around the port of Zeila to protect it from raids by Somali nomads.

A triple alliance was in the works involving Sultan Muhammed with the Ottoman leader Özdemir Pasha and Yeshaq ruler of the Ethiopian province of Medri Bahri. Nonetheless, Sultan Muhammed carried out an expedition against the Ethiopian Empire alone in 1573. This endeavor ended in total disaster. A great battle was fought between him and Sarsa Dengel at the Battle of Webi River, "but God gave victory to the infidels" as the Muslim chronicles state. Muhammad was captured and promptly executed by the Emperor; he was the last member of the Uthman dynasty to rule Harar. Most of the Adalite Harla army was also killed or captured by the Ethiopians. The loss was blamed on the Sultan's commanders who began collaborating with the Ethiopians, prior to this four weeks into battle it had remained a stalemate. According to Manfred Kropp, the Malassay did not demonstrate the same degree of allegiance to Muhammad as they had previously exhibited toward Ahmed ibn Ibrahim al-Ghazi.

This major defeat ended the Adal Sultanate status as a major military power thus the Harari state permanently ceased its aggression towards Ethiopia.
