= Eslamu =

General in the Ethiopian Empire

Ras Eslamu Sagad
- ልብነ ድንግል

Governor of Fatagar
- In office Unknown–1531
- Preceded by: Unknown
- Succeeded by: Ura’i Uthman

Personal details
- Born: c. 15th century
- Died: April 13, 1531; Zari, Fatagar, Ethiopian Empire

Military service
- Allegiance: Ethiopian Empire
- Rank: Azmach
- Battles/wars: Ethiopian–Adal War: Battle of Antukyah; Battle of Zari

Eslamu Sagad (Amharic: ልብነ ድንግል) was a general and nobleman in the Ethiopian Empire under Lebna Dengel who served as governor of Fatagar during the Ethiopian-Adal War.

== Biography ==
According to Ethiopian sources he received the name Eslamu Sagad due to his many battle with Muslim Adalites. Eslamu served as governor of Fatagar from at least 1527 to his death in 1531. Eslamu was in Damot during the beginning of the War specifically during Shimbra Kure however after General Degalhan, Lebna Dengel’s Brother-in-Law, requested to return to King's side in order to avoid fighting Ahmed Gurey’s army. Lebna Dengel placed Eslamu as Commander-in-chief of the Ethiopian Army. Eslamu's arrival greatly increased Ethiopian morale due to his reputation and highly esteemed position in the Lebna Dengel's court. However, during The Battle of Antukyah Eslamu's forces were completely routed with a large portion of his army killed. Eslamu fled to Zari where he received orders from Lebna Dengel, who was angered by the loss at Antukyah, berating him for losing to a much smaller force and demoting him and placed him under the command of Takla Iyasus, the governor of Angot. At Zari the Muslims were able to catch the Christian force off guard due to intelligence gathered from native Crypto Muslims. Eslamu was killed by an Adalite cavalryman by the name of Abū Bakr bin Garād Yumaj Ahmad during the battle.
