= Ottoman–Ethiopian War =

Ottoman-Ethiopian War, Ethiopian-Ottoman War, or Ottoman-Abyssinian War may refer to:

- Ethiopian–Adal War
- Ottoman–Ethiopian War (1557–1589)
  - Battle of Addi Qarro
  - Battle of Webi River
- Ethiopian–Ottoman border conflict
  - Battle of Gallabat (1837)
  - Battle of Wadkaltabu
  - Battle of Gallabat (1838)
  - Battle of Dabarki
- Ethiopian–Egyptian War
