= Talha ibn Abbas =

Talha ibn Abbas طلحة ابن عباس
- Sultan

Sultan of the Adal Sultanate
- Reign: 1569–1571
- Predecessor: Uthman the Abyssinian
- Successor: Nasir ibn Uthman
- Father: Wazir Abbas
- Religion: Sunni Islam

Talha ibn Abbas (Arabic: طلحة ابن عباس) was the sultan of the Sultanate of Adal in the Horn of Africa.

== Reign ==
Talha was the Son of Wazir Abbas, a famed Adalite general and nephew of Imam Ahmed Gurey.

After defeating a military force from Harar sent by Uthman the Abyssinian. The religious leaders assembled and appointed him as Sultan. This won the approval of the Harari military and led to much rejoicing in the city.

Talha, a man of peace, soon angered the militaristic party, for the local Muslim chronicles state that "he did not leave on a campaign for a jihad." After a short reign of a less than a year and a half, Talha was overthrown and replaced by Nasir ibn Uthman, the son of Uthman the Abyssinian.
