= Mansur ibn Muhammad =

Mansur ibn Muhammad منصور بن محمد
- Sultan

Sultan of the Adal Sultanate
- Reign: 1575–1577
- Predecessor: Muhammad ibn Nasir
- Successor: Muhammad Gasa
- Religion: Sunni Islam

Mansur ibn Muhammad (Arabic: منصور بن محمد) (died 1577), was a sultan of the Sultanate of Adal in the Horn of Africa.

== Reign ==
After Sultan Muhammad ibn Nasir departed from the city to wage war against the Ethiopian Empire, the Oromos had launched one of the most devastating attacks ever mounted on Harar, a local Harari chronicle states:

When the Galla knew that the Muslim army had gone to Abyssinia they devastated the land of Sa’adin and destroyed a hundred Muslim villages. Until they reached the city of Harar, and besieged the population for many days. The battles were fought on the gate of Harar so that the gate was full of corpses. The trench failed and the Galla broke the defense system of the city. It was in this battle that wazir Hamid was wounded with a spear twenty times.

Mansur then sent messages to the Somalis to come to the rescue of the city. The Somalis responded quick and favorably. With his new Somali troops Mansur was able to easily repel several Oromo attacks on Harar. He then went to Zeila and Aussa with 150 Somali cavalrymen and reestablished control over those areas. However, while in Aussa, Mansur was killed by one of his bodyguards.
