= Battle of Antukyah =

1531 battle of Ethiopia–Adal War

- Part of the Ethiopian–Adal War
Date	1531
Location	Ethiopia, 89 km (55 mi) south of Lake Hayq
Result	Adalite victory
Territorial changes	Shewa, Fatagar and Ifat annexed by Adal

Belligerents
Adal Sultanate	Ethiopian Empire

Commanders and leaders
(Adal Sultanate) Ahmad ibn Ibrahim	(Ethiopian Empire) Eslamu Sagad

Strength
12,000 men 500 cavalry 7 cannons (Note: Per Arab Faqīh.)	"anything up to 100,000 men under Eslamu"

Casualties and losses
800	1,500

The Battle of Antukyah was fought in 1531 between Adal Sultanate forces under Imam Ahmad ibn Ibrahim al-Ghazi and the Abyssinian army under Eslamu. Huntingford has located Antukyah about 89 kilometres (55 miles) south of Lake Hayq, at the edge of the Ethiopian Highlands, in the modern district of Antsokiya and Gemza.

Despite the care Eslamu took in deploying his men and their veteran status, the Ethiopian army panicked and fled when the Imam's cannons cut down hundreds of them. During the pursuit, Garad Hirabu pursued the Abyssinians with the Malassay and confronted the Abyssinian army three weeks later at the Battle of Zari. According to 16th century Adal writer of Futuh al-Habasha Arab Faqīh, the number of Ethiopian losses numbered around 1,500, while the number of Adalite losses was around 800.
