= Akhadom =

- Governor of Tigray
- Reign: c. 1425
- Predecessor: unknown
- Successor: unknown
- House: House of Agame

Akhadom is traditionally said to have been an ancestral father, to whom most notables and chiefs of Agame trace their pedigrees. Some of the ruling groups from other regions of Tigray also claim descent from him.

== Biography ==
Akhadom is considered to be the founder of the local dynasty of the shum Agame. Tembien, Mekonni or even Seqota are mentioned as his possible place of origin. He is said to have marched into Agame and defeated the earlier local ruler Kendashih, the descendant of the Summe, the ancestral father of the Irob. The shum Agame soon dominated the core area of Agame, near modern Adigrat. Akhadom's residence (maqmat mekonnen, "residence of the ruler) is said to have been situated somewhere in the area to the west of Adigrat.

Tradition places Akhadom 19 generations ago (with one generation ranging between 25-30 years), around 1425 AD. There is indeed a record of a certain Akhadom, precisely in the reign of atse Dawit II. While Dawit II was gaining control over the Beta Israel country, west of the Tekeze, his troops were on one occasion overpowered by Beta Israel resistance. The Emperor had sent fresh auxiliaries to them under the command of Akhadom, governor of Tigray. His expedition was successful.
