= Uthman the Abyssinian =

Uthman the Abyssinian عثمان الحبشة
- Emir of Harar

Leader of Adal
- Reign: 1567–1569
- Predecessor: Nur ibn Mujahid
- Successor: Tahla Abbas
- Religion: Sunni Islam

Uthman the Abyssinian (Arabic: عثمان الحبشة) was the Emir of Harar who ruled the Adal Sultanate, from 1567 to 1569.

== Reign ==
A former Abyssinian slave of Nur ibn Mujahid, Uthman succeeded him as Emir after Nur's death due to famine in 1567. Uthman adopted a much laxer approach to religion. He reportedly permitted wine drinking and appropriated the considerable wealth Nur had bequeathed for the city's orphans. He also signed an infamous and humiliating peace treaty with the Oromos. The treaty stated that the Oromos can freely enter to the Muslim markets and purchase goods at less than the current market price and that the Oromo refugees that had found asylum in the city should return to their tribes.

A local official of Aussa named Jibril soon defected and denounced what he considered Uthman's transgressions against Islamic law. The conflict came to a head when a local Muslim woman who had been taken by the pagan Oromos arrived as a refugee to Aussa. Uthman ordered Jibril to return the woman to the Oromos, Jibril refused, declaring that doing so would be contrary to God's law. Uthman despatched an army against this insubordinate official, who was defeated and killed. This rebellion was continued by Tahla Abbas, the grandson of Abun Adashe, who defeated Uthman and seized power in 1569.
