= Ethiopian–Adal War =

1529–1543 war between the Ethiopian Empire and Adal Sultanate

- Part of the Ottoman-Ethiopian Wars, Somali–Portuguese conflicts and Ottoman–Portuguese conflicts (1538–1560)
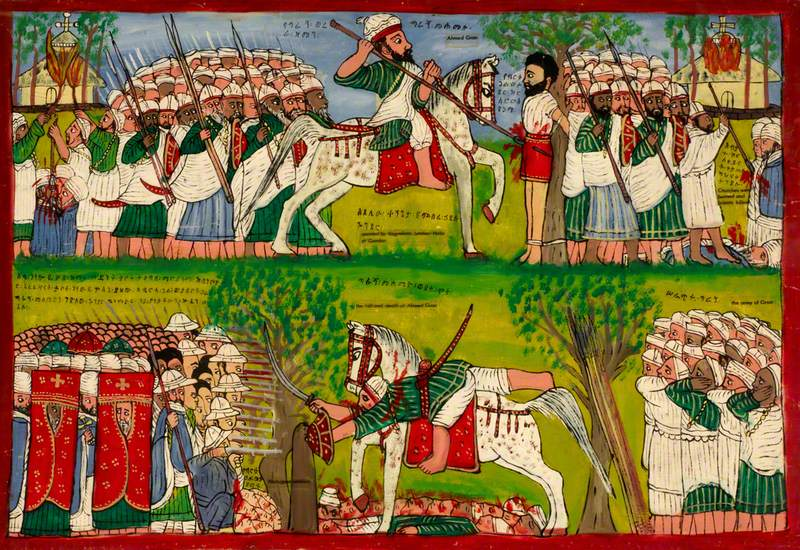
- Early 20th century folk drawing of Cristóvão da Gama and Imam Ahmad's deaths.
| Date | 9 March 1529 – 21 February 1543 (13 years, 11 months, 1 week and 5 days) |
| Location | Ethiopian Empire (present-day Ethiopia and Eritrea) |
| Result | Ethiopian–Portuguese victory |
| Territorial changes | Status quo ante bellum; Withdrawal of the few remaining Adal-Ottoman troops from the Ethiopian Highlands after the death of Ahmad ibn Ibrahim al-Ghazi and a subsequent reconquering of former territories. |

Belligerents
| Ethiopian Empire; Portuguese Empire (1541–43) | Adal Sultanate; Ottoman Empire (1542–43) |

Commanders and leaders
| (Ethiopian Empire) Dawit II # (Ethiopian Empire) Gelawdewos (Ethiopian Empire) Wasan Sagad † (Ethiopian Empire) Takla Iyasus † (Ethiopian Empire) Eslamu † (Portuguese Empire) Cristóvão da Gama (executed) | (Adal Sultanate) Ahmad ibn Ibrahim † (Adal Sultanate) Wazir Abbas (Adal Sultanate) Garad Matan † (Adal Sultanate) Ahmed Girri (Adal Sultanate) Abu Bakr Qecchin (Adal Sultanate) Garad Hirabu |

Strength
| (Portuguese Empire) 400 musketeers (1541) | (Ottoman Empire) 700 soldiers, 10 field guns (1542) |

The Ethiopian–Adal War, also known as the Abyssinian–Adal War and Futūḥ Al-Ḥabaša (Arabic: فتوح الحبش, lit. 'Conquest of Abyssinia'), was a war fought between the Christian Ethiopian Empire and the Muslim Adal Sultanate from 1529 to 1543. The Christian Ethiopian troops were drawn mainly from Tigray, Amhara, Gojjam, Begemder, Angot, Qeda, (Note: a district just north of Angot.) Gan, (Note: a province in the historic Amhara homeland) Medri Bahri, Gafat, and a certain numbers of Agaw troops At the closing of the war, the Christian forces were supported by the Portuguese Empire with no less than 400 musketeers. The Adal forces were composed of Harla/Harari, Somali, Afar as well as Arab and Turkish gunmen. Both sides would see the Maya mercenaries at times join their ranks. The conflict was followed shortly by the 16th century Ottoman–Ethiopian War.

== Background ==
In the early 1500s, Ethiopia faced significant pressure from the Adalites, who, under Imam Mahfuz, had commenced threatening their territory. The period following his death at the hands of the Ethiopians under Lebna Dengel was marked by an extended military succession crisis in Adal known as the Adalite Civil War, which concluded with Ahmed taking control. The defeat of Mahfuz had inadvertently strengthened the Adalite leadership, leading to a situation where proponents of peace with the Ethiopians would be reduced to a minority.

Imam Ahmad ibn Ibrahim al-Ghazi was a military leader of the medieval Adal Sultanate in the northern Horn of Africa. Between 1529 and 1543, he embarked on a campaign referred to as the Futuh al-Habasha, bringing the three-quarters of Christian Abyssinia under the control of the Muslim empire. With an army composed of Harari (Harla), and Somalis, al-Ghazi's forces came close to extinguishing the ancient Ethiopian kingdom, slaughtering any Ethiopian who refused to convert to Islam. Within the span of fourteen years the Imam was able to conquer the heartland of the country, wreaking havoc on the Christian nation.

However, the Abyssinians managed to secure the assistance of Cristóvão da Gama's Portuguese troops, and maintained their domain's autonomy. Both polities exhausted their resources and manpower in the process, resulting in the contraction of the two powers and altering regional dynamics for centuries to come. Many historians trace the origin of hostile Ethiopia–Somalia relations to this war. Some scholars also argue that this conflict proved the value, through their use on both sides, of firearms such as the matchlock musket, cannons, and the arquebus over traditional weapons.

Ethiopia's rulers had only recently gained access to firearms when the war began. Emperor Yeshaq I (1414–1429) was probably the first to acquire them, employing a former Turkish governor of Upper Egypt, Tabunga Muqrif, to train his men in their use, but for nearly a century afterward few such weapons reached the interior. By the 1520s Lebna Dengel possessed only two swivel guns and fourteen muskets recently purchased from the Turks, and almost all firearms in the country remained in royal hands.

== Course of the war ==
Fighting between Ahmad and the Christian kingdom had in fact broken out before the war's conventional starting date at the Battle of Hubat. Christian sources record a raid into Muslim border territory in 1527 led by Dagalhan, a brother-in-law of Lebna Dengel, and the Futuh al-Habasha describes two further clashes: at Badeqe in September 1528, and at Shimbra Kure in March 1529, where Ahmad's forces met the Christian king's army directly for the first time. Both sides still treated these as raids for plunder rather than a war of conquest; it is the Ethiopian chronicles that mark 1529, the year of Shimbra Kure, as the start of what they call the persecution. At Shimbra Kure itself, Imam Ahmad's Adal troops defeated a larger Ethiopian contingent; the Harari cavalry, also known as the Malassay, proved instrumental, as the Abyssinian troops were outmaneuvered.

The victories that gave the followers of Imam Ahmad the upper hand came in 1531. His forces routed the Emperor's massed army at the Battle of Antukyah on 23 February, cannon fire panicking the Ethiopian soldiers at the outset, one of the first shells cutting an olive tree in two and sending the Christian soldiers tumbling over one another as they fled, and followed it with a second victory at Ayfars on 31 March; the Adal army entered Barara, the imperial capital, that April or May.

Muslim communities within Christian territory helped Ahmad's advance multiple times. At Wis, a Muslim trading town in northern Sawa, the local population gave Ahmad a large quantity of gold when he passed through. He then took it for the war effort rather than pass it on to his wife Bati del Wambara as first offered. The same town later received three bronze and iron cannon carried overland from Zayla by camel. At Barara, south of the Awash, the Muslim population welcomed Ahmad and asked him for soldiers to protect them from Lebna Dengel's army while telling him where to find the monastery of Dabra Libanos and the royal treasury at the palace of Badeqe. Some Muslim inhabitants of Badeqe later collaborated with him and handed over treasure that had been intended for the Emperor.

When the war turned against him, Lebna Dengel placed Dagalhan at the head of his army. According to Ahmad's chronicler, Dagalhan found himself unequal to the task and privately asked his wife, Wayzaro Amata Watin, to speak with her brother the Emperor so that he might be relieved of command. He told her that if he were killed she would be left a widow and their children orphans, but asked her not to reveal that the request had come from him. She did so in secret, and Dagalhan was in due course replaced by another officer, Eslam Sagad, who was killed in battle.

Lebna Dengel narrowly escaped capture at the Battle of Amba Sel in Amhara on 27 October and spent his remaining years moving from place to place within his own realm, finally taking refuge at the isolated monastery of Debre Damo, where he died on 2 September 1540. These victories allowed the Adalites to enter the Ethiopian Highlands, where they began to sack and burn numerous churches, including Atronsa Maryam, where the remains of several Emperors had been interred.

Imam Ahmad defeated the armies of Agame and Tembien and marched towards Aksum to capture the historical Ethiopian city to solidify his rule in Ethiopia, echoing Mehmed II’s conquest of Constantinople, but the locals of Tigray had all assembled to defend their holy city. The Imam defeated and killed a large number of them as Arab Faqīh states, "Not a single one managed to slip away. They killed them in the forts, in the valleys and in the gorges. The ground was so thickly covered with their corpses, that it was impossible to walk in that place because of the dead bodies." He estimates that over 10,000 Christians were killed. The Imam reached Aksum and besieged the city, whereupon he destroyed the Church of Our Lady Mary of Zion. During his invasion of the Tigray region Ahmad ibn Ibrahim al-Ghazi visited the tomb of Najashi in Negash to pay his respects.

Geographically isolated from the main theatre of war, the country of the Bahr Nagash was among the last parts of the empire to face the Imam's armies directly. Men from Särayé had nonetheless joined the imperial forces fighting Ahmad further south. During those engagements, Bahr Negash Zä-Wängel, who held the port of Dehono, and the governor of Hamasén both died in battle against the Adäl army in Damot, and the ruler of Särayé was taken captive.

Having subdued the rest of the empire, the Imam turned northward in 1535, marching into Tegray and seizing Aksum before sending part of his army across the Märäb River into Särayé. Seeking to maintain local cooperation, the Adäl commanders installed Tédros, a relative of a prominent Christian family, as a subordinate governor under Vizier 'Abbas, the Imam's nephew. Local resistance proved fierce. A nobleman named Täsfa Le'ul killed Tédros and then 'Addolé, one of the Imam's senior commanders, whose severed head was despatched to Emperor Gelawdewos as a token of defiance. The Emperor marked the occasion with public celebration. The Imam retaliated by marching into Särayé in force, routing the defenders and putting Täsfa Le'ul and his sons to death. He then reorganised the administration of the region, appointing Täsfawi, the brother of the slain Tédros, as provincial governor and a local man named 'Afra as Bahr Negash.

The Adäl hold on Tegray lasted roughly a year before disease, supply failures and a conversion crisis within Ahmad's army prompted a withdrawal. The destruction left behind was severe. When the Portuguese soldier Miguel de Castanhoso reached the summit in 1541 he found churches burnt and the countryside around Debarwa, the Bahr Negash's seat of power, entirely abandoned, the inhabitants having fled into the hills with their livestock. Monks who had spent the occupation in hiding emerged to greet the Portuguese column carrying crosses and praying aloud.

Dawit's son and future emperor Prince Menas was captured by the forces of Imam Ahmad; the Empress was unable to react as she was besieged in the capital. The Portuguese forces would also be ambushed by the Adalites at the Battle of Massawa becoming the first encounter between the two groups. In February 1541, the Portuguese navy landed in Ethiopia 400 musketeers led by Cristóvão da Gama via Massawa, a port in Medri Bahri. The Portuguese went on to win battles, such as the Battle of Baçente, Jarte, Hill of the Jews which halted Adal's expansion. The turning point of the war seems to have begun at that moment.

The Portuguese besieged and took Amba Sanayti in central Tigray in February 1542, their first action after wintering with Empress Sabla Wangel at Debre Damo. In April they met Ahmad's army a second time at Antalo in Wajirat, the first engagement of his career against an enemy equipped with cannon, in which Ahmad was wounded and his horse killed under him. He sent an urgent appeal to Zabid for reinforcement, promising in return to become a vassal of Sultan Suleiman I, and Ottoman forces from Zabid answered with ten field guns and 700 soldiers. The Portuguese, reduced by the loss of fifty to a hundred men, spent the rains of 1542 at Wofla with the Empress, and da Gama sent Ayres Dias to open contact with Gelawdewos. In August they crossed the Tekeze into Semien, killed the Muslim commander Sidi Muhammad and restored a captured stronghold to its Beta Israel lords. A reinforced Muslim army caught up with them soon after; on 28 August 1542, Cristóvão da Gama was wounded, captured and killed along with thirteen of his men on Ahmad's own order, possibly at Wofla itself. About half the Portuguese company died in the fighting, but the survivors made their way to Semien and joined Gelawdewos in October 1542.

The Ethiopians and the Portuguese led by the Emperor scored a decisive victory in the Battle of Wayna Daga, fought at Zantara, also known as Gran Bar, within the district of Wayna Daga near Lake Tana. Accounts differ on who fired the fatal shot. Whiteway's account, drawing on Castanhoso, credits a Portuguese musketeer named João de Castilho, who had charged alone into the Muslim lines and died in the attempt; the Encyclopaedia Aethiopica's entry on Cristóvão da Gama instead follows Bermudez in crediting Pero de Lião, one of da Gama's own servants, with mortally wounding Ahmad by musket. By either account, the wounded Imam was beheaded on 21 February 1543 by an Ethiopian cavalry commander, Azmach Calite. His son Muhammad was taken prisoner at the same battle. Once the Imam's soldiers learned of his death, they fled the battlefield. The death of Imam Ahmad and the victory at Wayna Daga caused a collapse of Ahmad's forces and forced an Adalite retreat from Ethiopia.

Galawdewos's own campaign against Ahmad drew more than 100,000 people in total. Castanhoso, however, described one critical moment in the fighting when the actual fighting force numbered only 20,000 infantry and 2,000 cavalry, the rest being camp followers and women.

It was Bahr Nagash Yeshaq who first made contact with the Portuguese fleet at Massawa and persuaded the viceroy to send Cristóvão da Gama's force to the aid of Emperor Gelawdewos. He sheltered the expedition at Debarwa through the rains of 1541, supplying it with soldiers, guides and provisions before the march inland began. During this period, the men of Cristóvão da Gama's expedition invited Queen Sabla Wangel to visit their camp and received her with trumpets and artillery fire. A gesture that was so unfamiliar to Ethiopian custom that, according to Bermudes, she was "much astonished." While traveling through the territory of the Bahr Negash around the same time, the Empress was met by the Bahr Negash himself. He walked on foot beside her mule, naked to the waist with a lion's skin over his shoulders, and led her by the bridle, a customary display of submission whenever the Emperor or Empress made a formal entry into his territory.

The Encyclopaedia Aethiopica notes that Castanhoso's entire account of the campaign refers to Yeshaq only by his title, never once by name, reflecting the weight the office carried at the time. Yeshaq's own father had spent the occupation as a convert to Islam in the Imam's service, though after Ahmad's death he slipped away with a young member of the imperial family he had been guarding and negotiated a pardon from Gälawdewos in exchange for returning the child. Castanhoso believed the Emperor's willingness to forgive owed much to the debt he felt toward the Bahr Nagash for his assistance to the Portuguese.

== Motives ==
The Futūḥ al-Ḥabaša, the primary Arabic chronicle of the war, does not explain Ahmad's reasons for the invasion of Ethiopia. Later Ethiopian tradition, though, filled this gap with several different, partly competing, explanations.

=== Christian legendary explanations ===
The most widely attested tradition holds that Ahmad's invasion was a divine punishment for the pride of the Christian king, Lebna Dengel. Two independent transcriptions of Ethiopian chronicle material preserve different versions of this legend. In one, published by Ignazio Guidi, Lebna Dengel takes a census of his army in the 19th year of his reign, and upon learning he commands 900,000 soldiers besides his other forces, he "was overcome by pride and became very arrogant," prompting God to send Ahmad as a scourge. In a second version, recorded by Carlo Conti Rossini, the same episode instead centers on a massive herd of 30,000 horses, and when asked why he needed so many, the king reportedly replied, "What use are they to me, since I have no enemies?" Ahmad then appeared and killed the vanguard general. Conti Rossini notes the similarities with Guidi's version directly. André Caquot, when analyzing a related Amharic chronicle text, also concludes the legend explains Ahmad's "resounding successes" as an instrument of divine punishment for "the infidelity and pride of Lebna Dengel." Reidulf Molvaer's translations of independent Ethiopian oral traditions (compiled by Aleqa Tekle-Iyesus and Memhir Akalu Kidane-Mariyam) preserve essentially the same story, by explicitly comparing Lebna Dengel's troop census to the biblical King David's census of Israel, which similarly brought divine punishment.

A second legendary explanation holds that Ahmad's war was personal revenge, and that his father was a Christian monk killed by Ethiopian monks, which resulted in Ahmad's invasion to avenge this killing by massacring the monastic clergy. Molvaer's translated oral sources preserve a closely related, but not identical, story: that Ahmad's mother was made pregnant by a monk of Debre-Libanos who was later beaten to death by the monastery's clergy, and that she urged the young Ahmad to "revenge your father's blood."

=== Scholarly explanations ===
Modern historians, though, have proposed several non-personal explanations as well. Berhanou Abebe attributes the invasion to demographic, climatic, and economic factors, pointing to the highlands' wealth in slaves, ivory, and gold as a draw for the sultanate. Chekroun and Hirsch caution, however, that this theory is difficult to substantiate, since no contemporary source documents a population crisis or drought in the sultanate at the time.

Asa J. Davis argues that Ahmad's turn to conquest reflected broader Muslim resentment at paying tribute (jizyah) to a non-Muslim state, and a desire to break from the Ethiopian political hegemony over the Muslim sultanates of the region, pointing to Ahmad's early campaign against Ifat as evidence.

J. Spencer Trimingham similarly claims that the war began once Ahmad consolidated power; he "refused tribute and that made war inevitable."

According to B. G. Martin, however, the war can be understood in the context of a broader pattern of sixteenth-century mahdist and messianic movements. He notes that Ahmad's own chronicler refers to him as "Imam of the End of Time." The two main Arabic accounts of the war contain reports that there were prophecies at the time that predicted a righteous leader would one day emerge from Ahmad's homeland to conquer Ethiopia. In his analysis of the conflict, Martin applies Thomas Hodgkin's framework of mahdism in Africa, portraying Ahmad as a messianic and unifying figure who subordinated rival factions under his centralized rule. Despite being very critical of the idea of a single causative factor in this particular war, Martin identifies several social and economic factors that contributed to its occurrence among the coastal Danakil, Somali, and Balaw tribesmen that constituted Ahmad's army, including grievances over tribute, disruption to nomadic life, and a sense of economic and cultural disadvantage relative to the Christian highlands.

== Aftermath ==
In the months after Ahmad's death his forces splintered, some soldiers withdrawing toward the pre-conquest Muslim territories, others going over to the Christian side. The vizier Abbas tried to hold the annexed border provinces of Bali, Fatagar and Dawaro in the hope of reconstituting Muslim rule, but the resistance did not last: in October 1544, a year and a half after Ahmad's death, Gelawdewos defeated and killed Abbas, recovering these provinces along with Hadiya.

Emperor Galawdewos retained the services of around 170 of the Portuguese soldiers who had helped defeat Ahmad. He rewarded them with substantial lands, on which they lived, in Telles's words, "after the Country Fashion," keeping horses, mules and servants. Relations between the Emperor and his former allies soon soured, however, as Portuguese arrogance and attempts to impose Catholicism on the country led to conflict and their eventual banishment to the provinces. In the immediate aftermath of Ahmad's defeat, the Portuguese also hoped that Ethiopian gratitude for their assistance would help persuade Galawdewos to accept Catholicism; the Emperor refused, and instead wrote his own Confession of Faith defending Ethiopian religious practice against the friars' arguments.

The war was devastating for the Harari people which resulted in massive casualties for them and the conflict is regarded as one of the reasons for their rapid population decline. According to historian El Amin Abdel Karim Ahmed:

"The Muslim Semitic-speaking Harari once occupied more extensive territories as part of the medieval Muslim state of Adal with the town of Harar as its metropolitan centre. Politically weakened by the internal disputes and militarily exhausted by the jihad wars of the sixteenth century the Harari became an easy prey for the invading Oromo who battered and harassed them relentlessly. As a result they were constantly pushed back and managed to survive only as an isolated people confined within the stone-walled town of Harar and its immediate environs, while the Oromo occupied the regions all around them. Nevertheless Harar survived and continued its precarious existence as the capital of an emirate of the same name."

Mohammed Hassen has plausibly argued that because this conflict severely weakened both participants, it provided an opportunity for the Oromo people to conquer and migrate into the historically Gafat land of Welega south of the Blue Nile and eastward to the walls of Harar, establishing new territories.

The war contributed to the permanent loss of Fatagar, a Christian imperial province on the northern shore of the Awaš river with deep ties to the Solomonic dynasty. Ase Zärʿa Yaqob had been born there and Ase Bäydä Maryam had been crowned there. Ahmad's forces had raided the province as early as 1526 or 1527, and on a later return burned the royal palace at Badeqé and stripped it of its gold and cloth. Once Adäl power collapsed, the province passed into Oromo hands and the Encyclopaedia Aethiopica records that the toponym Fätägar gradually disappeared from use as the region ceased to be an imperial administrative unit.

The Gafat people, a Semitic-speaking group who had inhabited the territory around the upper Awaš and had sent soldiers to fight for Lebnä Dengel, were similarly left exposed. With the imperial system no longer able to project power into the south, they came under sustained Oromo pressure from the late 16th century onward and large numbers were displaced from their ancestral territory.

== See also ==
- Ottoman–Portuguese conflicts (1538–1559)
- History of Somalia
- History of Ethiopia
- Ethiopian–Somali conflict
- Battle of Hubat

== Bibliography ==
- Pankhurst, Richard (1998). The Ethiopians: A History. Peoples of Africa. Oxford: Blackwell Publishers. ISBN 0-631-22493-9.
- Pankhurst, Richard (1992). A Social History of Ethiopia: The Northern and Central Highlands from Early Medieval Times to the Rise of Emperor Tewodros II. The Red Sea Press. ISBN 0-932415-86-5.
- Caquot, André (1957). "Histoire Amharique de Grāñ et des Galla". Annales d'Éthiopie. 2: 123–143.
- Chekroun, Amélie; Hirsch, Bertrand (2020). "The Muslim-Christian Wars and the Oromo Expansion: Transformations at the End of the Middle Ages (ca. 1500–ca. 1560)". In Kelly, Samantha (ed.). A Companion to Medieval Ethiopia and Eritrea. Leiden: Brill. pp. 454–476. ISBN 978-90-04-41943-8.
- Conti Rossini, Carlo (1917). "Il libro delle leggende e tradizioni abissine dell'ecciaghié Filpòs". Rendiconti della Reale Accademia dei Lincei, Classe di scienze morali, storiche e filologiche. 5th ser. 26: 699–718.
- Davis, Asa J. (1964). "The Sixteenth Century Jihad in Ethiopia and the Impact on its Culture: Part Two, Implicit Factors Behind the Movement". Journal of the Historical Society of Nigeria. 3 (1): 113–128.
- Guidi, Ignazio (1907). "Leggende storiche di Abissinia". Rivista degli studi orientali. 1: 5–30.
- Martin, E. G. (1974). "Mahdism and Holy Wars in Ethiopia before 1600". Proceedings of the Seminar for Arabian Studies. 4. Archaeopress: 106–117.
- Molvaer, Reidulf K. (1998). "The Tragedy of Emperor Libne-Dingil of Ethiopia (1508–1540)". Northeast African Studies. 5 (2): 23–46.
- Trimingham, J. Spencer (1965). Islam in Ethiopia. London: Frank Cass. ISBN 0-7146-1731-8.
