= Adal Sultanate =

1415–1577 Muslim sultanate in the Horn of Africa

Adal Sultanate سلطنة عدل (Arabic)
- 1415–1577
- The combined three banners used by Ahmad al-Ghazi's forces

- The Adal Sultanate in c. 1540
- Capital: Dakkar (1415–1520); Harar (1520–1577); Aussa (1577)
- Official languages: Arabic
- Common languages: Harari; Somali; Afar; Argobba
- Religion: Sunni Islam (state); School: Shafi'i; Creed: Ashʿari
- Government: Sultanate
- Sultan
  - 1415–1423 (first): Sabr ad-Din III
  - 1577 (last): Muhammad Gasa
- Historical era: Middle Ages
  - Established: 1415
  - Sabr ad-Din III returns from exile in Yemen: 1415
  - War with Yeshaq I: 1415–1429
  - Succession Crisis: 1518–1526
  - Ethiopian–Adal war: 1529–1543
  - Disestablished: 1577
- Currency: Ashrafi
Preceded by	Succeeded by
Sultanate of Ifat	Imamate of Aussa
- Today part of: Djibouti; Ethiopia; Somalia (de jure) ∟ Somaliland (de facto)

The Adal Sultanate, (Note: Alt. spelling Adel Sultanate; Arabic: سلطنة عدل) also known as the Adal Empire or Barr Saʿad dīn, was a medieval Sunni Muslim empire which was located in the Horn of Africa. It was founded by Sabr ad-Din III on the Harar plateau in Adal after the fall of the Sultanate of Ifat. The kingdom flourished c. 1415 to 1577. At its height, the polity under Sultan Badlay controlled the territory stretching from Cape Guardafui in Somalia to the port city of Suakin in Sudan.

The empire's frequent wars with its Christian rival, the Solomonic dynasty of Abyssinia, during the 15th and 16th centuries, led by important early figures such as Jamal ad-Din II, Badlay, and Mahfuz, would earn the sovereigns of Adal a reputation in the Islamic World as one of saints, and were as a result regularly supplied with arms, horses and other articles of war. In the 16th century under the leadership of Imam Ahmed ibn Ibrahim al-Ghazi and his successor Nur ibn Mujahid, Adal embarked on the Conquest of Abyssinia deploying muskets and cannons. The war would eventually draw in the Portuguese and Ottoman Empires. The Adalites maintained a strong relationship with the Ottomans in particular.

The Adal Empire had a string of important ports and inland cities such as Harar, Zeila, Abasa, Amud, Awbare, Awbube, Berbera, Dakkar and many others, which flourished under its reign with courtyard houses, mosques, shrines, walled enclosures, cisterns and were integrated into the commercial network that tied the kingdoms and empires of the Red Sea and the Indian Ocean together. Adal acquired its wealth through the trade of millet, cattle, fruits, slaves, gold, barley, ivory and other commodities. The cities of the empire imported intricately coloured glass bracelets and celadon wares from the Ming Dynasty for palace and home decoration while its merchants used currencies such as dinars and dirhams during commercial transactions. The Adal Sultanate was alternatively known as the federation of Zeila and in 1577 moved its capital to Aussa.

== Etymology ==
Adal is believed to be an abbreviation of Havilah. Eidal or Aw Abdal, was the Emir of Harar in the eleventh century which the lowlands outside the city of Harar is named. In the thirteenth century, the Arab writer al-Dimashqi refers to the city of Zeila, by its Somali name "Awdal" (Somali: "Awdal"). The modern Awdal region of Somaliland, which was part of the Adal Sultanate, bears the kingdom's name.

Locally, the empire was known to Muslims as Barr Sa'ad ad-din, meaning "The country of Sa'ad ad-Din", in reference to the Sultan Sa'ad ad-Din II, who was killed in Zeila while fighting the Ethiopian Emperor Dawit I.

== History ==
=== Early history ===
Adal (also Awdal, Adl, or Adel) was situated east of the province of Ifat and was a general term for a region of lowlands inhabited by Muslims. It was used ambiguously in the medieval era to indicate the Muslim inhabited low land portion east of the Ethiopian Empire. Including north of the Awash River towards Lake Abbe as well as the territory between Shewa and Zeila on the coast of Somaliland. According to Ewald Wagner, Adal region was historically the area stretching from Zeila to Harar.

In 1288, the region of Adal was conquered by the Ifat Sultanate. Despite being incorporated into the Ifat Sultanate, Adal managed to maintain a source of independence under Walashma rule, alongside the provinces of Gidaya, Dawaro, Sawans, Bali, and Fatagar. In 1332, Adal was invaded by the Ethiopian Emperor Amda Seyon I. His soldiers were said to have ravaged the province.

In the fourteenth century Haqq ad-Din II transferred Ifat's capital to the Harar plateau thus he is regarded by some to be the true founder of the Adal Sultanate. In the late 14th century, the Ethiopian Emperor Dawit I collected a large army, branded the Muslims of the surrounding area "enemies of the Lord", and invaded Adal. After much war, Adal's troops were defeated in 1403 or 1410 (under Emperor Dawit I or Emperor Yeshaq I, respectively). According to al-Maqrizi, the Walashma ruler Sa'ad ad-Din II was captured and executed in Zeila, which he claims was sacked. However, no other contemporary source corroborates the invasion of Zeila, and it is thought that an Amhara incursion into Zeila was unlikely to have occurred. His children and the remainder of the Walashma dynasty would flee to Yemen where they would live in exile until 1415. According to Harari tradition numerous Argobba had fled Ifat and settled around Harar in the Aw Abdal lowlands during their conflict with Abyssinia in the fifteenth century, a gate was thus named after them called the gate of Argobba.

=== Rise of the Sultanate ===
In 1415, Sabr ad-Din III, the eldest son of Sa'ad ad-Din II, would return to Adal from his exile in Arabia to restore his father's throne. He would proclaim himself "king of Adal" after his return from Yemen to the Harar plateau and established his new capital at Dakkar. Sabr ad-Din III and his brothers would defeat an army of 20,000 men led by an unnamed commander hoping to restore the "lost Amhara rule". The victorious king then returned to his capital, but gave the order to his many followers to continue and extend the war against the Christians. The Emperor of Ethiopia Tewodros I was soon killed by the Adal Sultanate upon the return of Sa'ad ad-Din's heirs to the Horn of Africa. Sabr ad-Din III died a natural death and was succeeded by his brother Mansur ad-Din who invaded the capital and royal seat of the Solomonic Empire and drove Emperor Dawit I to Yedaya where according to al-Maqrizi, Sultan Mansur destroyed a Solomonic army and killed the Emperor. He then advanced to the mountains of Mokha, where he encountered a 30,000 strong Solomonic army. The Adalite soldiers surrounded their enemies and for two months besieged the trapped Solomonic soldiers until a truce was declared in Mansur's favour. During this period, Adal emerged as a centre of Muslim resistance against the expanding Christian Abyssinian kingdom. Adal would thereafter govern all of the territory formerly ruled by the Ifat Sultanate, as well as the land further east all the way to Cape Guardafui, according to Leo Africanus.

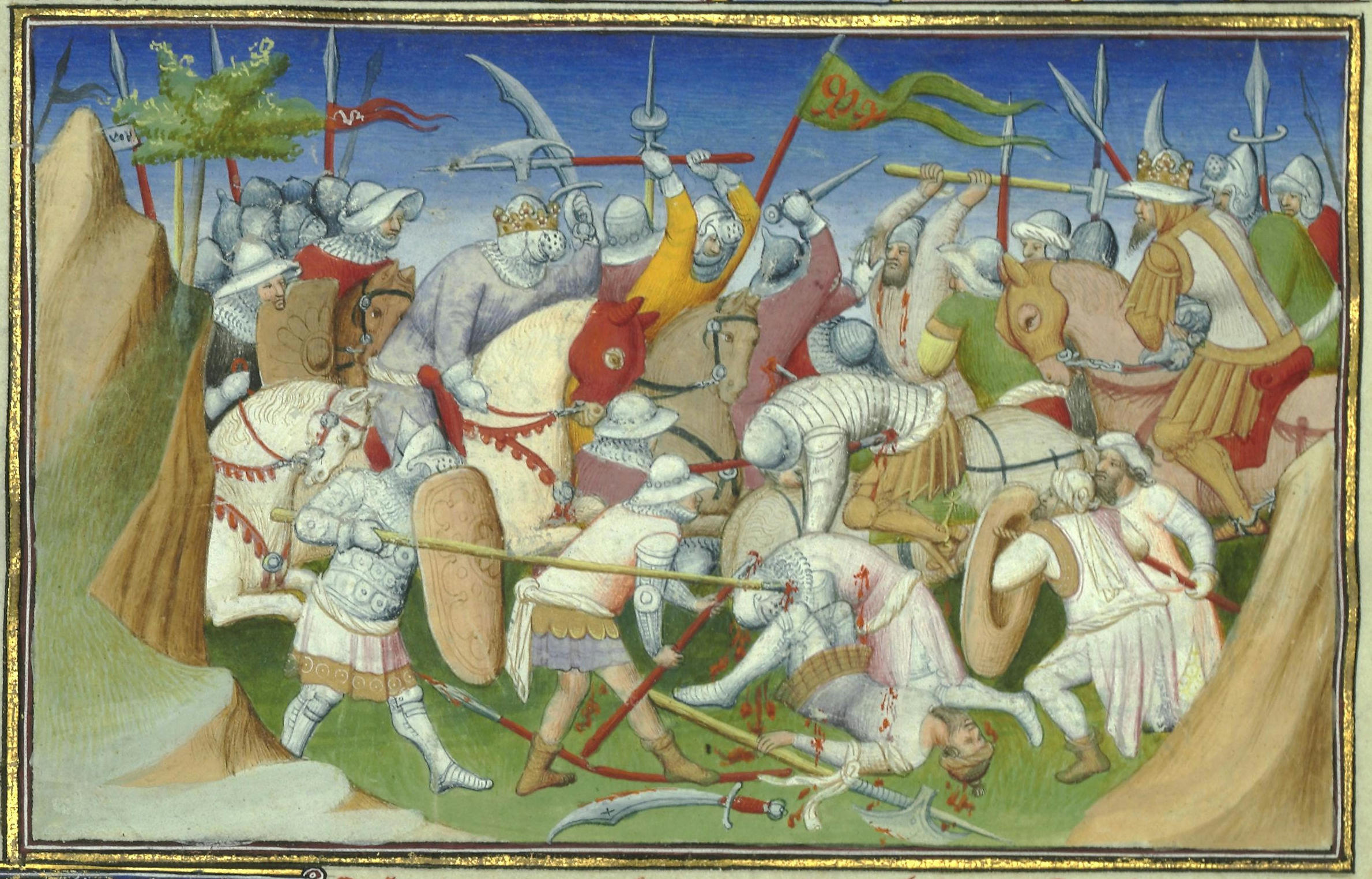
The Sultan of Adal (right) and his troops battling King Yagbea-Sion and his men. From Le Livre des Merveilles, 15th century.

Later on in the campaign, the Adalites were struck by a catastrophe when Sultan Mansur and his brother Muhammad were captured in battle by the Solomonids. Mansur was immediately succeeded by the youngest brother of the family Jamal ad-Din II. Sultan Jamal reorganized the army into a formidable force and defeated the Solomonic armies at Bale, Yedeya and Jazja. Emperor Yeshaq I responded by gathering a large army and invaded the cities of Yedeya and Jazja, but was repulsed by the soldiers of Jamal. Following this success, Jamal organized another successful attack against the Solomonic forces and inflicted heavy casualties in what was reportedly the largest Adalite army ever fielded. As a result, Yeshaq and his men fled to the Blue Nile region over the next five months, while Jamal ad Din's forces pursued them and looted much gold on the way, although no engagement ensued.

After returning home, Jamal sent his brother Ahmad with the Christian battle-expert Harb Jaush to successfully attack the province of Dawaro. Despite his losses, Emperor Yeshaq was still able to continue field armies against Jamal. Sultan Jamal continued to advance further into the Abyssinian heartland. However, Jamal on hearing of Yeshaq's plan to send several large armies to attack three different areas of Adal (including the capital), returned to Adal, where he fought the Solomonic forces at Harjai and, according to al-Maqrizi, this is where the Emperor Yeshaq died in battle. The young Sultan Jamal ad-Din II at the end of his reign had outperformed his brothers and forefathers in the war arena and became the most successful ruler of Adal to date. Within a few years, however, Jamal was assassinated by either disloyal friends or cousins around 1432 or 1433, and was succeeded by his brother Badlay ibn Sa'ad ad-Din. Sultan Badlay continued the campaigns of his younger brother and began several successful expeditions against the Christian empire. He reconquered Bali and began preparations of a major Adalite offensive into the Ethiopian Highlands. He successfully collected funding from surrounding Muslim kingdoms as far away as the Sultanate of Mogadishu. However, this ambitious campaign ended in disaster when Emperor Zara Yaqob defeated Sultan Badlay at the Battle of Gomit in 1445 and pursued the retreating Adalites all the way to the Awash River. After killing Badlay and plundering his treasures, the Zara Yaqob decided not to conquer the Adalites, believing they were outside of the Christian boundary and shouldn't be included in his kingdom.

=== Decline of sultan's authority ===
Following the defeat and death of Badlay ibn Sa'ad ad-Din at the Battle of Gomit, the next Sultan of Adal, Muhammad ibn Badlay, submitted to Emperor Baeda Maryam I and started paying annual tribute to the Ethiopian Empire with which he secure peace. Adal's Emirs, who administered the provinces, interpreted the agreement as a betrayal of their independence and a retreat from the polity's long-standing policy of resistance to Abyssinian incursions. Emir Laday Usman of Harar subsequently marched to Dakkar and seized power in 1471. However, Usman did not dismiss the Sultan from office, but instead gave him a ceremonial position while retaining the real power for himself. Adal now came under the leadership of a powerful Emir who governed from the palace of a nominal Sultan. Usman would route emperor Baeda Maryam's troops in battle. Historian Mohammed Hassen states the sultans of Adal had lost control of the state to Harar's aristocracy.

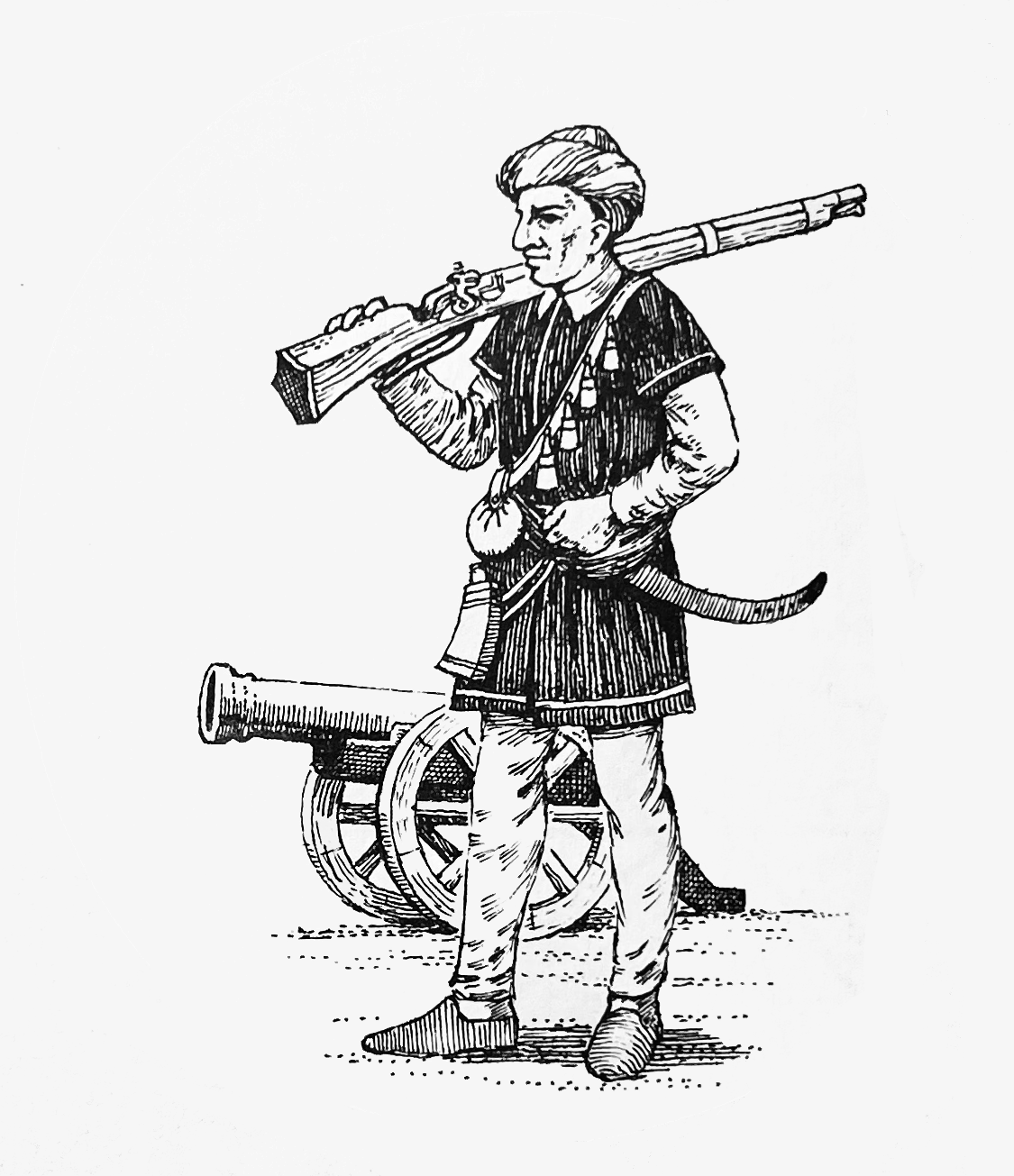
A soldier of Imam Ahmad armed with a musket and a cannon

Emperor Na'od and Sultan Muhammad ibn Azhar ad-Din tried to remain at peace, but their efforts were nullified by the raids which Emir Mahfuz constantly made into Christian territory. Na'od who was determined to eliminate this threat, organized a large army and led it against the Emir, although the Emperor was victorious he was eventually killed in battle against the Adalites. Emperor Dawit II (Lebna Dengel) would soon succeed the throne, Mahfuz having recovered from his defeat renewed raids against the frontier provinces. He was stimulated by emissaries from Arabia who proclaimed the jihad (holy war), presented him with a green standard and brought in arms and trained men from Yemen. In 1516, Emir Mahfuz would then launch an invasion of Fatagar, Lebna Dengel was prepared and organized a successful ambush, the Adalites were defeated and Mahfuz was killed in battle. Lebna Dengel then moved into Adal where he sacked the city of Dakkar. Around the same time a Portuguese fleet surprised Zeila whilst its garrison was away with Mahfuz, the Portuguese then burnt down the port city.

After the victory of Lebna Dengel, the internal weaknesses of the Adal Sultanate soon revealed themselves. The older generation of the Muslims headed by the Walashma, indifferent to religion and ready to come to terms with Abyssinia, were staunchly opposed by the Harari and Harla religious aristocracy led by fanatic warlike emirs. The Sultan Muhammad was assassinated in 1518 and Adal was torn apart by intestinal struggles in which five sultans succeeded each other in two years. But at last, a matured and powerful leader called Garad Abun Adashe assumed power and brought order out of chaos. However, Sultan Abu Bakr ibn Muhammad, who had transferred the capital from Dakkar to Harar in 1520, profiting off the prestige that the hereditary monarchy still held, recruited bands of Somali nomads, ambushed Abun Adashe at Zeila and killed him in 1525. Many people went to join the force of a young rebel named Ahmad ibn Ibrahim, who claimed revenge for Garad Abogn. Ahmad did not immediately attempt conclusions with Sultan Abu Bakr, but retired to Hubat to build up his strength. Ahmad ibn Ibrahim would eventually kill Sultan Abu Bakr in battle, and replaced him with Abu Bakr's younger brother Umar Din as his puppet. Once in complete control, he then could then turn to the task he felt himself was divinely appoint to undertake, the conquest of Abyssinia. Fervor for the jihad had not yet overcome the forces inherent in nomadic life, Ahmad had to undertake several campaigns to restore order in the Somali territory which would constitute his manpower reserve. He then organized a heterogenous mass of tribes into a powerful army, inflamed by the fanatical zeal of jihad.

=== Conquest of Abyssinia ===
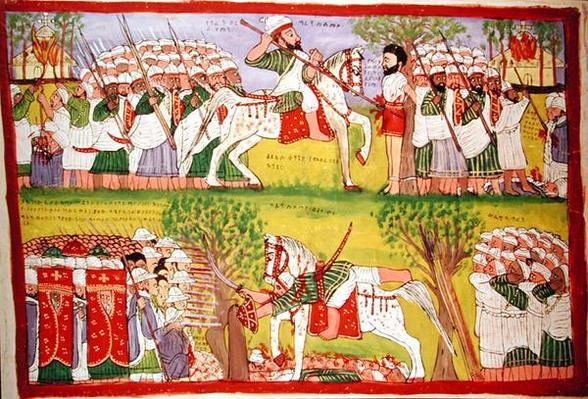
Early 20th century folk drawing of Cristóvão da Gama and Ahmad Gragn's deaths.

According to sixteenth century Adal writer Arab Faqīh, in 1529 Imam Ahmad ibn Ibrahim al-Ghazi finally decided to embark on a conquest of Abyssinia, he soon met the Abyssinians at the Battle of Shimbra Kure where he would win a decisive victory. But his nomads where unreliable and difficult to control, to Ahmad's frustration some of his Somali warriors would disperse back to their homelands after acquiring much plunder. At the same time, he faced opposition from his Harari troops who dreaded the potential consequences of the Muslim base relocating to Abyssinia. He then returned to Harar to reconstruct his forces and eliminate the tribal allegiances in his army, two years later he was able to organize a definite and permeant occupation of Abyssinia. From then the story of the conquest is a succession of victories, burnings and massacres. In 1531 Dawaro and Shewa were occupied, Bete Amhara and Lasta in 1533. In 1535 Ahmad, in control of the east and center of Abyssinia invaded Tigray where he encountered fierce resistance and suffered some reserves, but his advance was not stopped, his armies reached the coasts of Medri Bahri where they made contact with Queen Ga'ewa of Mazaga who joined their campaign against the Ethiopian Empire. Emperor Dawit II (Lebna Dengel) became a hunted fugitive, and harried from Tigray to Begemder to Gojjam, constantly pursued by the Adalites. In this period Adal Sultanate occupied a territory stretching from Zeila to Massawa as well as the Abyssinian inlands.

The Adalites were passionately interested in converting newly occupied territories. The impression given in the Muslim chronicles is that almost all of the Christian Abyssinians had embraced Islam out of expediency. Among them was the governor of Ifat who wrote to the Imam:

I was once a Muslim, the son of a Muslim, but the polytheists captured me and made me a Christian. Yet at heart I remain steadfast in the religion and now I seek the protection of Allah, His prophet, and yourself. If you accept my repentance and do not punish for what I have done I will return to Allah whilst these armies that are under my command I will deceive them so that they will come to you and embrace Islam.

However, in the integral regions of the Ethiopian Empire, such as Bete Amhara, Tigray and Shewa, the local population bitterly resisted the Adalite occupation. Some preferred death over denying their faith, among them were two Amhara chiefs who were brought before the Imam in Debre Berhan. Arab Faqīh describes the encounter:

They captured two Christian chiefs and sent them to the Imam's encampment and presented them before him. He said "What is the matter with you that you haven't become Muslims when the whole country was Islamized?" They replied "We don't want to become Muslims." The Imam said "Our judgment on you is that your heads be cut off." The two Christians replied "Very well!" The Imam was surprised at their reply and ordered them to be executed.

In 1541 a small Portuguese contingent landed in Massawa and soon all of Tigray declared for the monarchy, the Imam was defeated in several major engagements by the Portuguese and was forced to flee to Raya Kobo with his heavily demoralized followers. He sent a request to the Ottoman Empire for reinforcements of Turkish, Albanian and Arab musketeers to stabilize his troops. He then took the offensive attacking the Portuguese camp at Wolfa where he killed their commander, Cristóvão da Gama, and 200 of their rank and file. The Imam then dismissed most of his foreign contingent and returned to his headquarters at Lake Tana. The surviving Portuguese were able to meet up with Gelawdewos and his army at the Simien Mountains. The Emperor did not hesitate to take the offensive and won a major victory at the Battle of Wayna Daga when the fate of Abyssinia was decided by the death of the Imam and the flight of his army. The invasion force collapsed like a house of cards and all the Abyssinians who had been cowed by the invaders returned to their former allegiance, the reconquest of Christian territories proceeded without encountering any effective opposition.

=== Collapse of the sultanate ===
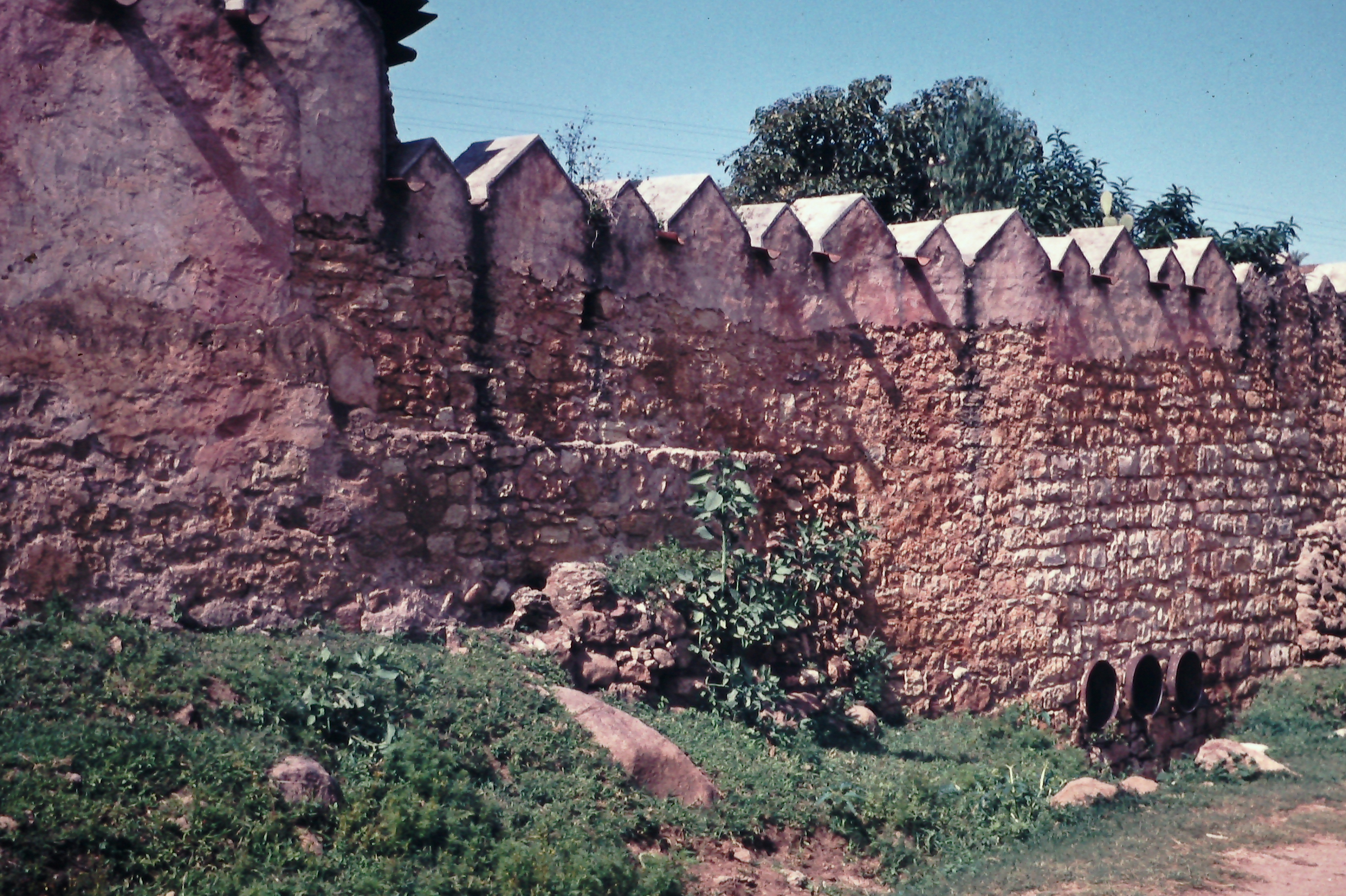
The surrounding walls of the fortified city of Harar built by Emir Nur ibn Mujahid

In 1550 Nur ibn Mujahid became the Emir of Harar and the de facto ruler of Adal, he then began to strengthen the defenses of Harar, building a wall that still encircles the city to this day. In 1559, urged on by his wife, Nur once again took the offensive and invaded the Ethiopian Empire, killing Ethiopian Emperor Gelawdewos in the Battle of Fatagar. At the same time another Ethiopian army led by Dejazmatch Hamalmal attacked Harar. Sultan Barakat ibn Umar Din attempted to defend the city but was defeated and killed, thus ending the Walashma dynasty. Not long after this, Barentu Oromos who had been migrating north invaded the Adal Sultanate. This struggle, which was mentioned by the monk Bahrey, led to the devastation of many regions and Nur's army was defeated at the Battle of Hazalo. The defensive walls managed to protect Harar from the invaders, preserving it as a kind of Muslim island in an Oromo sea. However, the city then experienced a severe famine as grain and salt prices rose to unpreceded levels. According to a contemporary source, the hunger became so bad that people began to resort to eating their own children and spouses. Nur himself died in 1567 of the pestilence which spread during the famine.

Nur was succeeded by Uthman the Abyssinian, who relaxed his predecessor's pro-Islamic policy and signed an infamous and humiliating peace treaty with the Oromos. The treaty stated that the Oromos can freely enter to the Muslim markets and purchase goods at less than the current market price. This angered many Muslims and led to a rebellion, in which he was overthrown and replaced by Talha Abbas in 1569. Tahla would rule for only three years before being overthrown by some of his very fanatic subjects who were intent on another jihad or holy war against the Christians. He was replaced by Uthman's grandson Muhammad ibn Nasir who soon carried out an expedition against the Ethiopian Empire, however this campaign would end in total disaster. As soon as the army left Harar the Oromo ravaged the countryside, up to the walls of the city. Muhammad ibn Nasir was also defeated and killed at the Battle of Webi River, thus permanently ending Adal aggression towards Ethiopia. Muhammad's successor, Mansur ibn Muhammad, fought a fierce war against the Oromos, but was unable to defeat them. Mansur would also successfully reconquer Aussa and Zeila. The tension was all the greater after the death of Nur Ibn Mujahid, the disappearance of the last of the Walashma monarch also opened a tough competition for power between emirs and descendants of Ahmed Ibn Ibrahim. Ultimately, they won in April 1576, Muhammad Gasa took the title of Imam, thus combining the political power of the Sultan and the religious responsibility of guiding the community, he then relocated the capital to the oasis of Aussa in 1577, establishing the Imamate of Aussa.

The Imamate of Aussa declined gradually in the next century and was destroyed by the neighboring Afar nomads who made Aussa their capital. In the seventeenth century the induction of Harla people and Doba populations into Afar identity would lead to the emergence of Aussa Sultanate. Enrico Cerulli asserts that rulers of Zaila and Harar had effectively made themselves independent with the latter establishing the Emirate of Harar. For two centuries, Adal Sultanate had claimed the role of spreading Islam in Ethiopia, but it now had to transition into an uncivilized state ruled by the Bedouin Dankalis, whom the Semitic or semiticized Adal aristocracy regarded merely as a group designated to plunder caravans.

Scholar Christopher Ehret noted that the majority of the inhabitants of the Adal Sultanate's primary territories were integrated into the Oromos, with the exception of small groups of Harari and Argobba speakers of Semitic languages.

== Demographics ==
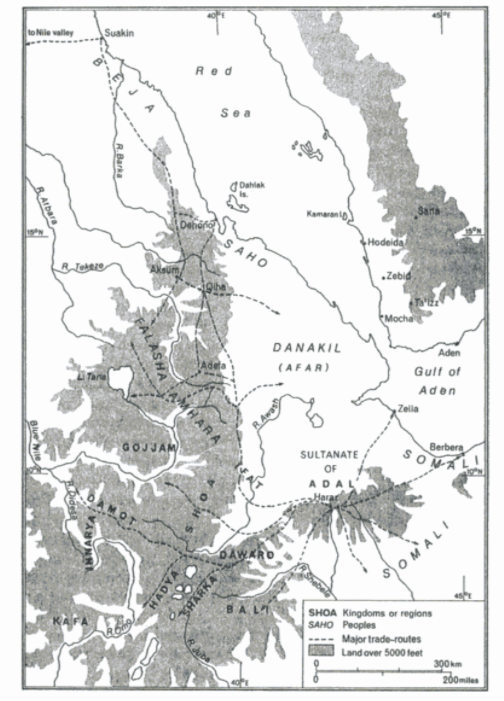
Medieval map of peoples, kingdoms and regions alongside major trade routes in the Horn

Ulrich Braukämper mentions that Adal was distinguished by its ethnic variety which included Somalis, Afars, Argobba, and Hararis. Ethiopian historian Taddesse Tamrat states that Adal's central authority in the fourteenth century consisted of the Argobba, Harari and Silt'e people. Professor Donald N. Levine, an important figure in Ethiopian Studies, described the Adal Sultanate as consisting of many ethnic groups, but primarily Somalis and Afars. Somali scholar Abdurahman Abdullahi Baadiyow notes that Somalis joined the Adal Sultanate in the 13th century and were instrumental in the ensuing conflicts with Abyssinia. The Somali tribes, already influential in Adal's politics, rose to greater prominence with the emergence of Garad Abun. According to Patrick Gikes and Mohammed Hassen, Adal in the sixteenth century was primarily inhabited by the sedentary Harla people and the pastoral Somali people. According to Gorman, the population of the Adal Sultanate was composed largely of northern Somalis. The Cambridge History of Africa states that the Somalis were a major section of the population. The sultanate was said to have included pastoral tribes, among them Somalis. Marriage alliances between Argobba, Harari and Somali people were also common within the Adal Sultanate.

According to Professor Lapiso Gedelebo, the contemporary Harari people are heirs to the ancient Semitic speaking peoples of the Adal region. Adal Sultanate is identified as a Harari state by anthropologist Abebe Kifleyesus. Historians state the language spoken by the people of Adal as well as its rulers the Imams and Sultans would closely resemble contemporary Harari language. Ethiopian historian Bahru Zewde and others state the Walasma led Sultanates of Ifat and Adal primarily included the Ethiopian Semitic speaking Argobba and Harari people, it later expanded to comprise Afar and Somali peoples. Between the late 1400s to mid 1500s there was a large scale migration of Hadhrami people into Adal.

Among the earliest mentions of the Somali by name has come through a victory poem written by Emperor Yeshaq I of Abyssinia against the king of Adal, as the Simur are said to have submitted and paid tribute. As Taddesse Tamrat writes: "Dr Enrico Cerulli has shown that Simur was an Old Harari name for the Somali, who are still known by them as Tumur. Hence, it is most probable that the mention of the Somali and the Simur in relation to Yishaq refers to the king's military campaigns against Adal, where the Somali seem to have constituted a major section of the population."

According to Leo Africanus (1526) and George Sale (1760), the Adelites were of a tawny brown or olive complexion on the northern littoral, and grew swarthier towards the southern interior. They generally had long, lank hair. Most wore a cotton sarong but no headpiece or sandals, with many glass and amber trinkets around their necks, wrists, arms and ankles. The king and other aristocrats often donned instead a body-length garment topped with a headdress. All were Muslims. In the southern hinterland, the Adelites lived beside pagan "Negroes", with whom they bartered various commodities.

=== Languages ===
British historian Richard Pankhurst states the Adalites spoke Harari language. Various languages from the Afro-Asiatic family were spoken in the vast Adal Sultanate. Arabic served as a lingua franca, and was used by the ruling Walashma dynasty. According to the 19th-century Ethiopian historian Asma Giyorgis suggests that the Walashma dynasty themselves spoke Arabic. According to Robert Ferry, Adal's aristocracy in the Walasma era which consisted of imams, emirs and sultans spoke a language resembling modern Harari language. British historian John Fage states Walasma leaders moving their capital from Ifat region to Adal set in motion the evolution of Harari and Argobba language within Harar and its environs. According to Jeffrey M. Shaw, the main inhabitants of the Adal Sultanate spoke East Cushitic languages. In Zeila, the port city of Adal Sultanate, the Somali language was mainly spoken.

=== Religion ===
The Adalites were affiliated with Sufi groups including Ba 'Alawiyya and Shadhili. In medieval literature, it was also noted that the inhabitants engaged in the practice of Zikr.

== Economy ==
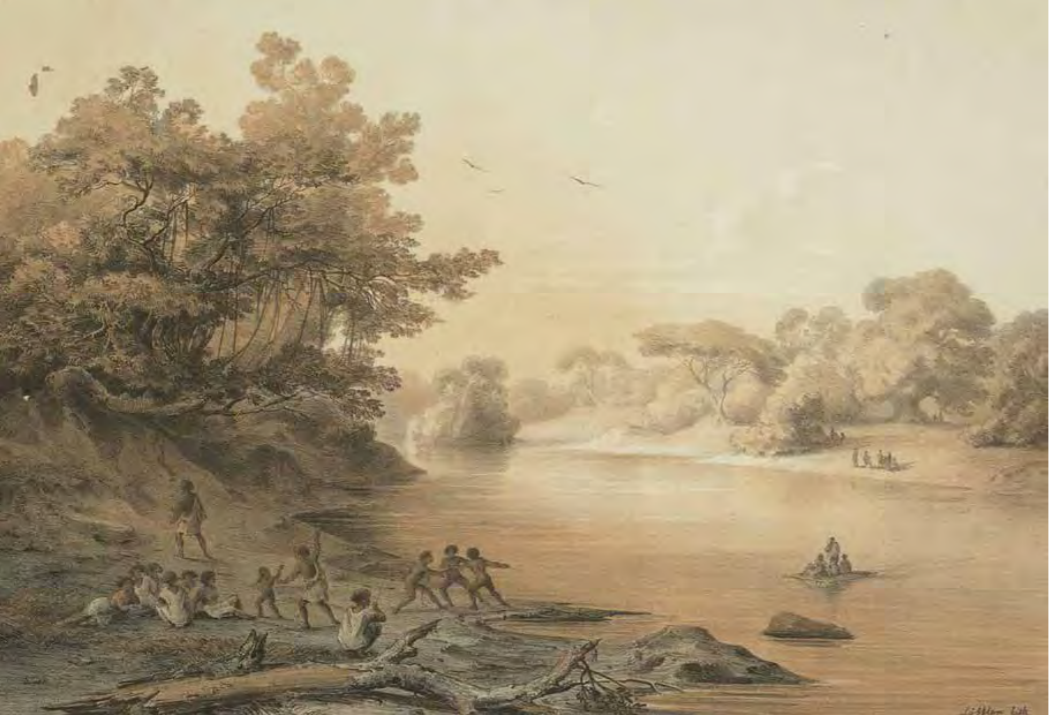
Awash River was the main river of the Adal and Ifat sultanates and provided abundant agricultural produce and fresh water.

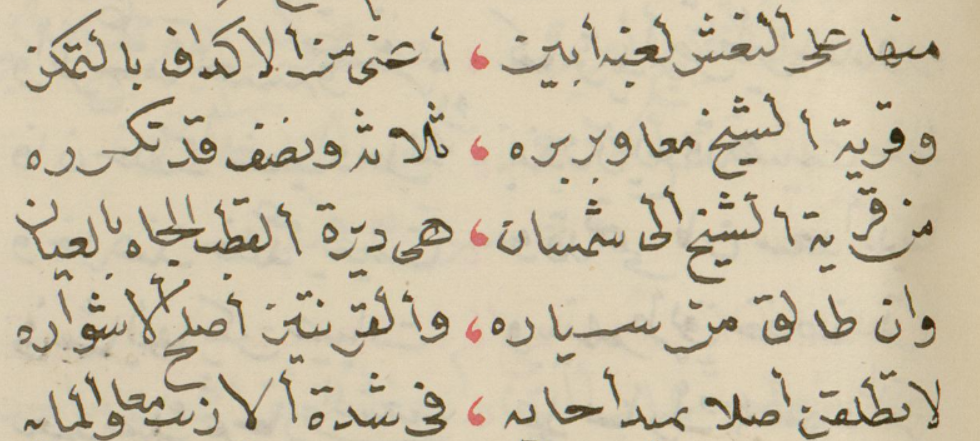
Ibn Majid's notes on Berbera which was a large port of the sultanate

One of the empire's most wealthy provinces was Ifat it was well watered, by the large river Awash. Additionally, besides the surviving Awash River, at least five other rivers in the area between Harar and Shawa plateau existed. The general area was well cultivated, densely populated with numerous villages adjoining each other. Agricultural produce included three main cereals, wheat, sorghum and teff, as well as beans, aubergines, melons, cucumbers, marrows, cauliflowers and mustard. Many different types of fruit were grown, among them bananas, lemons, limes, pomegranates, apricots, peaces, citrons mulberries and grapes. Other plants included sycamore tree, sugar cane, from which kandi, or sugar was extracted and inedible wild figs.

The province also grew the stimulant plant Khat. Which was exported to Yemen. Adal was abundant in large numbers of cattle, sheep, and some goats. There was also chickens. Both buffaloes and wild fowl were sometimes hunted. The province had a great reputation for producing butter and honey.

Whereas provinces such as Bale, surrounding regions of Webi Shabelle was known for it cotton cultivation and an age old weaving industry, while the El Kere region produced salt which was an important trading item.

Zeila was a wealthy city and abundantly supplied with provisions. It possessed grain, meat, oil, honey and wax. Furthermore, the citizens had many horses and reared cattle of all kinds, as a result they had plenty of butter, milk and flesh, as well as a great store of millet, barley and fruits; all of which was exported to Aden. The port city was so well supplied with victuals that it exported it's surplus to Aden, Jeddah, Mecca and "All Arabia" which then was dependent on the supplies/produce from the city which they favoured above all. Zeila was described as a "Port of much provisions for Aden, and all parts of Arabia and many countries and Kingdoms".

The Principal exports, according the Portuguese writer Corsali, were gold, ivory and slaves. A "great number" of the latter was captured from the Ethiopian Empire, then were exported through the port of Zeila to Persia, Arabia, Egypt and India.

As a result of this flourishing trade, the citizens of Zeila accordingly lived "extremely well" and the city was well built guarded by many soldiers on both foot and horses.

The kingdoms agricultural and other produce was not only abundant but also very cheap according to Maqrizi thirty pounds of meat sold for only half a dirhem, while for only four dirhems you could purchase a bunch of about 100 Damascus grapes.

Trade on the upland river valleys themselves connected with the coast to the interior markets. Created a lucrative caravan trade route between Ethiopian interior, the Hararghe highlands, Eastern Lowlands and the coastal cities such as Zeila and Berbera. The trade from the interior was also important for the reason that included gold from the Ethiopian territories in the west, including Damot and an unidentified district called Siham. The rare metal sold for 80 to 120 dirhems per ounce. The whole empire and the wider region was interdependent on each other and formed a single economy and at the same time a cultural unit interconnected with several important trade routes upon which the economy and the welfare of the whole area depended.

The nobility of Adal also apparently had a fair taste for luxury, the commercial relations that existed between the Adal Sultanate and the rulers of the Arab peninsula allowed Muslims to obtain luxury items that Christian Ethiopians, whose relations with the outside world were still blocked, could not acquire, a Christian document describing Sultan Badlay relates:

And the robes [of the sultan] and those of his leaders were adorned with silver and shone on all sides. And the dagger which he [the sultan] carried at his side was richly adorned with gold and precious stones; and his amulet was adorned with drops of gold; and the inscriptions on the amulet were of gold paint. And his parasol came from the land of Syria and it was such beautiful work that those who looked at it marveled, and winged serpents were painted on it.

During its existence, Adal had relations and engaged in trade with other polities in Northeast Africa, the Near East, Europe and South Asia. Many of the historic cities in the Horn of Africa such as Abasa, Amud, Awbare and Berbera flourished under its reign with courtyard houses, mosques, shrines, walled enclosures and cisterns. Adal attained its peak in the 14th century, trading in slaves, ivory and other commodities with Abyssinia and kingdoms in Arabia through its chief port of Zeila. The cities of the empire imported intricately coloured glass bracelets and Chinese celadon for palace and home decoration. Adal also used imported currency such as Egyptian dinars and dirhems. British archaeologist A. G. Mathews concluded that the large stone pens found in the ruins of medieval cities like Amud served the purpose of holding slaves as they passed through to the port cities of Berbera and Zeila from the interior of the Adal Sultanate.

== Military ==
The Military of Adal was divided into several sections such as the infantry consisting of swordsmen, archers and lancers that were commanded by various generals and lieutenants. These forces were complemented by a cavalry force and eventually, later in the empire's history, by matchlock-technology and cannons during the Conquest of Abyssinia. The various divisions were symbolised with a distinct flag.

Under Imam Ahmed's leadership, the military was reorganized into three flexible units, giving Adal a strategic advantage. This superior organization contrasted sharply with the rigid and poorly commanded Abyssinian forces. The first group was the Malassay, the elite unit of military warriors in the Adal army which according to several historians consisted of mainly the Harari ethnicity. The title Malassay or Malachai (Portuguese spelling) often became synonymous with Muslims in Ethiopia to outsiders, but contrary to popular beliefs it did not denote a tribe or clan. Reading the Futuh al-Habasha, the Malasāy appear as the basic unit of the army of the imām. Unlike the other groups that make up this army, the Malasāy were a social group and not a tribe or a clan. Unlike the Balaw, Somali or Ḥarla, a man Malasāy is not born. He obtained this title after demonstrating his military capabilities. ‘Arab Faqīh gives a relatively precise definition of what he means by "malasāy:

And the Malasāy troop, who are people of raids and ğihād, worthy men of confidence, who could be trusted during the fighting, of the army chiefs who not only do not flee from the battlefield but who protect the retreat of his family. The imām was with them.

The second wing consisted entirely of Somalis, commanded by the Imam's brother-in-law Matan. The third wing comprised troops from the Afar, Harla, Harari, and Argobba people, with each led by their hereditary leader. During each battle, the wings were separated with one on the right and left, while the Malassay were positioned in the middle. At crucial moments, the Malassay supported both wings and prevented troops from abandoning the field.

The Adal soldiers donned elaborate helmets and steel armour made up of chain-mail with overlapping tiers. The horsemen of Adal wore protective helmets that covered the entire face except for the eyes, and breastplates on their body, while they harnessed their horses in a similar fashion. In siege warfare, ladders were employed to scale buildings and other high positions such as hills and mountains.

M. Hassan states:

Arab Faqih makes it very clear that the sedentary agriculturalists population of Harar provided both the leadership in the jihadic war and that they were the majority of the fighters at least during the early days of the jihad. All the four Wazirs appointed by Imam Ahmad were members of the landed Adare (Harari) and Harla hereditary nobility. Of the fifty or so Amirs appointed by Imam Ahmad between 1527 and 1537, the overwhelming majority were members of the hereditary landed Adare or Harla aristocracy.

M. Lewis writes:

Somali forces contributed much to the Imām’s victories. Shihāb ad-Dīn, the Muslim chronicler of the period, writing between 1540 and 1560, mentions them frequently (Futūḥ al-Ḥabasha, ed. And trs. R. Besset Paris, 1897). The most prominent Somali groups in the campaigns were the Geri, Marrehān, and Harti – all Dārod clans. Shihāb ad-Dīn is very vague as to their distribution and grazing areas, but describes the Harti as at the time in possession of the ancient eastern port of Mait. Of the Isāq only the Habar Magādle clan seem to have been involved and their distribution is not recorded. Finally, several Dir clans also took part.

Ethnic Somalis are stated to be the majority of the army according to the Oxford History of Islam:

The sultanate of Adal, which emerged as the major Muslim principality from 1420 to 1560, seems to have recruited its military force mainly from among the Somalis.

According to Merid Wolde Aregay:

At Shembra-Kuré the issue was determined most nearly by the superiority of Ahmad's cavalry. This consisted of personal followers, carefully chosen from amongst the young men of Harar, who were well trained and experienced. Ahmad had armed his horsemen with good sabres from the markets of Zayla and Arabia. The cavalry included a number of Arabs who had responded to Ahmäd's call for help in what he considered was a holy war against the unbelievers of Ethiopia. Many of these Arabs were especially skilled in the use of the sabre and they probably had shared this skill with the Harari horseman.

== Legacy ==
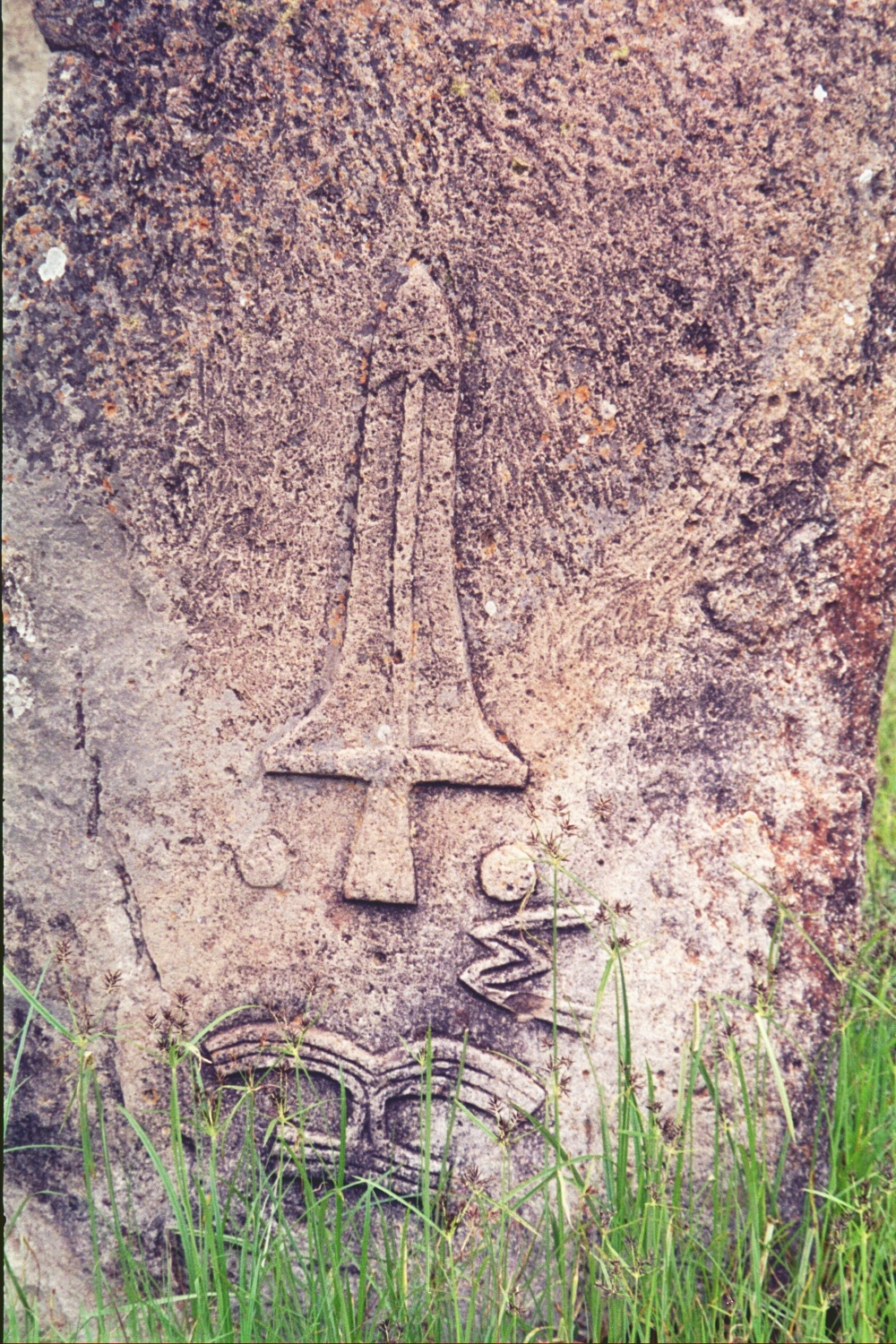
A sword symbol on a stele at Tiya

The Adal Sultanate left behind many structures, artefacts and remains from its heyday. Numerous such historical edifices and items are found in the northwestern Awdal province of Somaliland, as well as other parts of the Horn region where the polity held sway. According to archaeologist Jorge Rodriguez, substances located in western northern Somalia indicate outposts were mainly established during the Adal Sultanate, and don't predate the ruins found in ancient Islamic regions of Ifat or Harar plateau, this he states reaffirms the notion that modern eastern Ethiopia is where the principal Muslim kingdoms materialized.

Archaeological excavations in the late 19th century and early 20th century at over fourteen sites in the vicinity of Borama in modern-day northwestern Somaliland unearthed, among other artefacts, silver coins identified as having been derived from Qaitbay (1468–89), the eighteenth Burji Mamluk Sultan of Egypt. Most of these finds are associated with the medieval Adal Sultanate. They were sent to the British Museum for preservation shortly after their discovery.

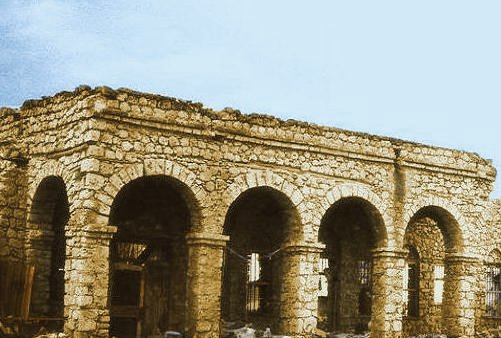
Ruins of the Sultanate of Adal in Zeila

In 1950, the British Somaliland protectorate government commissioned an archaeological survey in twelve desert towns in present-day Republic of Somaliland, near the border with Ethiopia. According to the expedition team, the sites yielded the most salient evidence of late medieval period affluence. They contained ruins of what were evidently once large cities belonging to the Adal Sultanate. Towns such as Awbare, Awbube, Amud, Abasa and Gogesa, featured between 200 and 300 stone houses. The walls of certain sites still reportedly stood 18 meters high. Excavations in the area yielded 26 silver coins, unlike the copper pieces that were more common in polities below the Horn region. The earliest of these recovered coins had been minted by Sultan Barquq (1382–99), also of the Egyptian Burji dynasty, and the latest were again Sultan Qaitbay issues. All of the pieces had been struck in either Cairo or Damascus. A few gold coins were also discovered during the expedition, making the area the only place in the wider region to yield such pieces. Besides coinage, high quality porcelain was recovered from the Adal sites. The fine celadon ware was found either lying on the surface, or buried at a depth of seven and a half inches, or ensconced within dense middens four to five feet high. Among the artefacts were grey granular sherds with a cracked blue-green or sea-green glaze, and white crystalline fragments with an uncracked green-white glaze. Some Ming dynasty ware was also discovered, including many early Ming blue-and-white bowl sherds. They were adorned with tendril scrolls on a bluish ground and ornamented with black spotting, while other bowls had floral patterns outlined by grey or black-blue designs. Additionally, a few Ming red-and-white sherds were found, as well as white porcelain fragments with bluish highlights. The Adal sites appeared to reach an Indian Ocean terminus at the Sa'ad ad-Din Islands, named for Sultan Sa'ad ad-Din II of the Ifat Sultanate.

According to French historian Jean Doresse, the only city that has endured to the present day from the extensive kingdom of Adal is Harar, which gained its independence, while the many towns that once thrived now exist in ruins within the Somali desert.

Additionally, local tradition identifies the archaeological site of Tiya in central Ethiopia as Yegragn Dingay ("Gran's stone") in reference to Imam Al-Ghazi. According to Joussaume (1995), who led archaeological work there, the site is relatively recent. It has been dated to between the 11th and 13th centuries CE. Tiya contains a number of megalithic pillars, including anthropomorphic and non-anthropomorphic/non-phallic stelae. Flat in form, these structures are characterized by distinctive, elaborate decorations, among which are swords, a standing human figure with arms akimbo, and plant-like symbols.

== Rulers ==
	Name	Reign	Note
1	Sulṭān SabiradDīn SaʿadadDīn	1415–1422	Son of SaʿadadDīn Aḥmed, He returned to the Horn of Africa from Yemen to reclaim his father's realm. He defeated the Ethiopians and proclaimed himself "King of Adal". He subsequently became the first ruler and founder of the new Adal dynasty.
2	Sulṭān Mansur SaʿadadDīn	1422–1424	Son of SaʿadadDīn Aḥmed. Defeated the Abyssinians at their royal seat of Yadeya, captured and killed the Solomonic Emperor Dawit. The tides of war changed him and his brother Muhammad was eventually captured by Yeshaq
3	Sulṭān JamaladDīn SaʿadadDīn	1424–1433	He increased the riches of Adal, brought numerous land under its rule and during his reign a multitude of Amhara Christians embraced Islam. He won important battles against the Abyssinians and raided deep into their interior as far as the Blue Nile before his forces being defeated after an exhausted pursuit back to protect the capital. Emperor Yeshaq would also die in battle during his Adal campaign.
4	Sulṭān Sihab ad-Din Ahmad Badlay "Arwe Badlay"	1433–1445	Son of SaʿadadDīn Aḥmed, known to the Abyssinians as "Arwe Badlay" ("Badlay the Monster"). Badlay turned the tide of war against the Abyssinians and decisively defeated the forces of Emperor Yeshaq and expanded the power & reach of Adal to the entire northern seaboard. Managed to capture Abyssinian frontier provinces and brought numerous Christian land under his rult. Badlay founded a new capital at Dakkar in the Adal region, near Harar. He was killed in battle after he had launched a jihad to invade and occupy Abyssinia after the Hadiya Sultanate an Adal tributary state was occupied by emperor Zara Yaqob.
5	Sulṭān Maḥamed AḥmedudDīn	1445–1472	Son of AḥmedudDīn "Badlay" SaʿadadDīn, Maḥamed asked for help from the Mameluk Sultanate of Egypt in 1452, though this assistance was not forthcoming. He ended up signing a very short-lived truce with Baeda Maryam which was nullified by his son Usman who subsequently defeated the emperors troops in battle.
6	Sulṭān ShamsadDin Maḥamed	1472–1488	Son of Maḥamed AḥmedudDīn, he was attacked by Emperor Eskender of Abyssinia in 1479, who sacked Dakkar and destroyed much of the city, though the Abyssinians failed to occupy the city and were ambushed on the way home with heavy losses and no more incursions happened for the remainder of Eskender's reign. Eskender and his succeeding brother Na'od would later be killed in battle against emir Mahfuz's raiding parties.
7	Sulṭān Maḥamed ʿAsharadDīn	1488–1518	Great-grandson of SaʿadadDīn Aḥmed of Ifat, he continued to fight to liberate Dawaro along with Garad Maḥfūẓ of Zeila. He was assassinated after a disastrous campaign in 1518 and the death of Garad Maḥfūẓ.
8	Emir Abūn ʿAdādshe	1518–1525	During his reign conflict ensued between the Amīrs and the Sultans for 7 years. Abun was de facto ruler of Adal due to his popularity in the state defending the frontier against Abyssinian raiding parties, this popularity would lead to resentment from the Adal sultan.
9	Sulṭān Abūbakar Maḥamed	1525–1526	He killed Garād Abūn but Garād Abūn's cousin Imām Aḥmed avenged his cousin's death and killed him. While Garād Abūn ruled in Harar, Abūbakar Maḥamed was centered in Dakkar however after killing Garad Abun, Abubakar moved the Adal Sultanate capital to Harar in 1520.
10	Sulṭān ʿUmarDīn Maḥamed	1526–1553	Son of Maḥamed ʿAsharadDīn, Imām Aḥmed put Maḥamed ʿAsharadDīn's young son ʿUmarDīn on the throne as puppet king in Imām Aḥmed's capital at Harar. This essentially is the end of the Walashma dynasty as a ruling dynasty in all but name, though the dynasty hobbled on in a de jure capacity. Many king lists don't even bother with Walashma rulers after this and just list Imām Aḥmed and then Amīr Nūr Mujahid.
11	Sulṭān ʿAli ʿUmarDīn	1553–1555	Son of ʿUmarDīn Maḥamed
12	Sulṭān Barakat ʿUmarDīn	1555–1559	Son of ʿUmarDīn Maḥamed, last of the Walashma Sultans, assisted Amīr Nūr Mujahid in his attempt to retake Dawaro. He was killed defending Harar from Emperor Gelawdewos, ending the dynasty.
13	Amīr Nūr "Dhuhi-Suha" ʿAli	1559–1567	The Amir of Harar. The walls that surround Harar were built during his reign and he had convinced the people of Harar (the Harla) to abandon their clan and tribal identities and become one people, the Harari nation. Emperor Gelawdewos was defeated in battle and killed by emir Nur at the Battle of Fatagar
14	Amīr ʿIsmān "AlḤabashi"	1567–1569	A former Abyssinian slave of Amīr Nūr, he was murdered shortly after becoming Sultan.
15	Sulṭān Ṭalḥa ʿAbbās	1569–1571	Son of Wazir ʿAbbās Abūn and grandson of Garād Abūn ʿAdādshe. Overthrown and replaced by Nasir ibn Uthman.
16	Sulṭān Nāssir ʿIsmān	1571–1572	Son of Amīr ʿIsmān AlḤabashi.
17	Sulṭān Maḥamed Nāssir	1572–1576	Grandson of Amīr ʿIsmān AlḤabashi. He was executed by Emperor Sarsa Dengel after the Battle of Hadiya. The Harari military was decimated by Ethiopian forces ending Adal's aggression towards Ethiopia permanently. The Oromo simultaneously attacked several villages in Hararghe while the main Harar army was away leading to further weakening of the sultanate.
18	Amir Mansūr Maḥamed	1576–1577	Son of Sulṭān Maḥamed Nāssir. He successfully defeated several Oromo invasions and reclaimed territory including Zeila and Aussa.
19	Imām Maḥamed "Jāsa" Ibrahim	1577	A relative of Imām Aḥmed, he moved the capital to Awsa and founded the Imāmātē of Awsa. He was killed in battle with the Oromo in 1583.

=== Family tree ===
Walashma dynasty

Sa'ad al-Din II; Ahmad; Sultan of Ifat r. 1386/7–1402/3
Sabr al-Din III; Sa'ad al-Din r. 1415–1422/3	Mansur; Sa'ad al-Din r. 1422/3–1424	Jamal al-Din II; Sa'ad al-Din r. 1424–1433	Badlay; Sa'ad ad-Din r. 1433–1445	Abu Bakr; Sa'ad al-Din
Muhammad; Badlay r. 1445–1472	Azhar; Abu Bakr
Shams al-Din; Muhammad r. 1472–1488	Muhammad; Azhar r. 1488–1518
Abu Bakr; Muhammad r. 1525–1526	Umar al-Din; Muhammad r. 1526–1553
Ali; Umar al-Din r. 1553–1555	Barakat; Umar al-Din r. 1555–1559

Harari Emirs

Ibrahim	Abun Adashe r. 1518–1525
Mujahid ibn Ali	daughter	Abbas Abun
Mahfuz	Talha Abbas r. 1569–1571
Nur ibn Mujahid r. 1550–1567	Bati del Wambara	Ahmad ibn Ibrahim al-Ghazi
(Former Slave)
Uthman al-Habshi r. 1567–1569
Nasir ibn Uthman r. 1571–1573
Muhammad ibn Nasir r. 1573–1575	Ibrahim
Mansur ibn Muhammad r. 1575–1577	Muhammad; Gasa r. 1577–1577
Imamate of Aussa

== See also ==
- Garad, administrative Adal title
- Hegano, administrative Adal title
- Malak, administrative Adal title
- Kabir, religious Adal title
- List of Sunni Muslim dynasties
- Gadabuursi Ughazate
