= Angot =

Ethiopian province of medieval times

Angot (Amharic: አንጎት, translated as "Neck," possibly referring to the provinces geography) was a historical province in northern Ethiopia. It was bordered on the west by Bugna and the Afar lowlands to the east and southeast, Ambassel to the southwest and Lasta to the north.

== Axumite History ==
Under the reign of Degna Djan, during the 10th century, the empire kept expanding south, and sent troops into the modern-day region of Kaffa, while at the same time undertaking missionary activity into Angot. Emperor Dil Na'od is said to have relocated the capital to Ku'bar on the shore of Lake Hayq, south of Angot, and built the Istifanos Monastery. Aksum by that time was no longer the center of the Christian kingdom, and was instead a frontier town, threatened from the west and south by the Bete Israel and from the north by invading Beja tribes. Angot was a much more defensible position, a decision that proved wise when Beta Israel captured Aksum during Queen Gudit's invasion. The capital, called Ku'bar or Jarmi, was probably located in southern Tigray or Angot, however the exact location of this city is currently unknown.

== Later history ==
Angot is mentioned as being north of Bete Amhara in the medieval period. The region was governed by Ali Ankarsah of Adal in the sixteenth century. Angot was on the front line between Abyssinia and the Afar lowlands, and after multiple wars, was occupied by the Oromo tribes of Raya, Wollo and Yejju. In more recent times, it became part of Wollo Province and is now the northern part of North Wollo Zone.
