= Ifat (historical region) =

Historic state in Horn of Africa

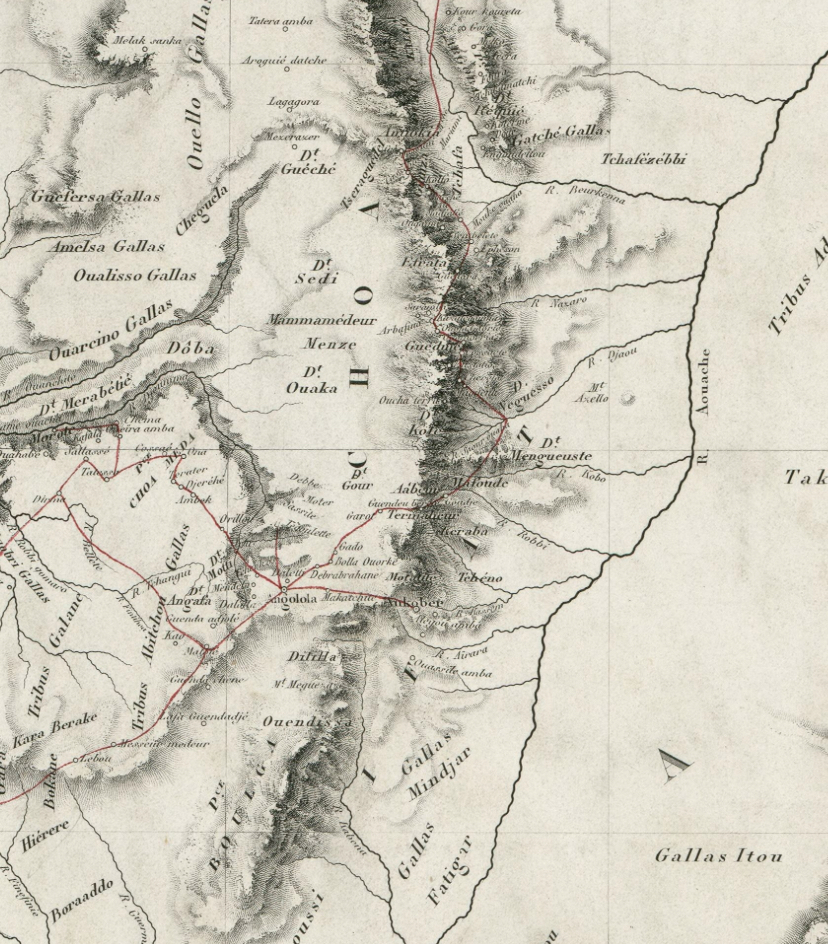
19th century map of Ifat located east of the Shewan highlands and west of the Awash River.

Ifat (Harari: ኣው ፋት Aw Fāt; Amharic: ይፋት Yifāt; Somali: Awfat) also known as Wafāt or Awfāt (along with its eponymous capital) in Arabic texts, was a historical Muslim region in the Horn of Africa. It was located on the eastern edge of Shewa.

== Etymology ==
Historian Alaqa Taye Gabra Mariam asserts that Ifat translates to 'unveil'. It is thought that the area is connected to the Arab migration of the lineage of Abd al-Rahman ibn Muljam, who were concerned about potential reprisals after the Assassination of Ali the caliph.

== Geography ==
According to thirteenth century Arab geographer Ibn Sa'id al-Maghribi, Ifat was alternatively known as Jabarta.

In the fourteenth century Al Umari mentioned seven cities or domains within Ifat: Biqulzar, Adal, Shewa, Kwelgora, Shimi, Jamme and Laboo.

Medieval Portuguese missionary Manuel de Almeida stated Ifat was confined by Amhara Province in the west. Ifat designated the Muslim dominated portion of Shewa in Abyssinia according to post seventeenth century Harari texts, its territory extended from the Shewan uplands east, towards the Awash River.

== History ==
During Islam's inception tradition states the Banu Makhzum and Umayyad coalitions quarreled in Ifat. According to historian Enrico Cerulli, in thirteenth century Sultan Umar Walasma founded the Ifat Sultanate in Ifat after overthrowing the Makhzumi dynasty and subsequently invading states of Hubat, Gidaya, Hargaya etc. The later Ifat rulers who are described as zealous would expand their dominion from Zequalla in eastern Shewa to Zeila on the coast of Somalia thus the Muslim dominated regions of the Horn of Africa would be known as Ifat up to the fourteenth century.

Medieval Mamluk historian al-Maqrizi describing the dominion of Ifat states:

The length of this kingdom is 15 days, and its breadth twenty. It abounds with well inhabited towns and the price of corn is not high. This was told to me by Sheikh Shihab ad din Ahmed ibn Abdal of Moghreb who travelled throughout the world. "When I was in Awfat", he said, "I saw in that town Damascus grapes of which bunches bunches bearing about 100 grapes were sold for 4 dirham".

In 1328 during Emperor Amda Seyon of Ethiopia's crusades, the territory of Ifat was invaded and incorporated into his empire after defeating its sultan Haqq ad-Din I's forces in battle. Ifat would lose its prominence as the Muslim power in the region to Adal following the Abyssinian annexation of its dominion.

In the mid fourteenth century Ifat leader Jamal ad-Din I would rebel against Abyssinia by forming an alliance with the Adal leader Salih to battle the forces of the emperor Amda Seyon. In the late fourteenth century, Ifat rebel leaders Haqq ad-Din II and Sa'ad ad-Din II transferred their base to Adal in the Harar region founding the Adal Sultanate. These two Walasma princes exiled from Ifat had moved to an area around Harar which today Argobba and Harari speakers exist. According to Harari tradition numerous Argobba people had fled Ifat, and settled around Harar in the Aw Abdal lowlands during their conflict with Abyssinia in the fifteenth century, a gate was thus named after them called the gate of Argobba. According to Ayele Tariku, in the mid-1400s emperor Zara Yaqob assigned a military battalion in Ifat region following his successful defence of the frontier from the attacks of Adal Sultanate.

The Adalites began successfully invading Abyssinia in the early 1500s during the reign of imam Mahfuz and briefly captured Ifat. According to sixteenth century Adal writer Arab Faqīh, Ifat was governed by the Adalite, Abūn b. ‘Uthmān following its conquest by the Adal Sultanate under Ahmed ibn Ibrahim al-Ghazi during the Ethiopian-Adal war. Historian Abdurahman Garad asserts that the Adalites would later relinquish control of Ifat to the Abyssinians, as indicated by the chronicles of the Emirate of Harar, which reveal that the governor of Ifat no longer held the title Hegano-Garad. Sometime in the early 1600s, after the Karayu Oromo surrendered to Abyssinian forces, Emperor Yaqob demanded that the tribes who had capitulated take control of the lands of Ifat and the region extending towards Adal. In the midst of the turmoil in the region following the Oromo invasions, the Abyssinians under Nagasi Krestos managed to repel the Adalites from Ifat in 1682.

During Ifat peoples defence of their frontier from the Oromo invasions in the early seventeenth century, the Ifat Muslim leaders formed an alliance with Christian rulers of Shewa however the region much like neighboring Bale, Fatagar, Angot and others would eventually succumb to the Oromos. In the eighteenth century, slave and salt commerce was active in Ifat mainly Wollo where its reported Afar brokers would transport them to Tadjoura on the coast. Later in the nineteenth century Ifat towns such as Aliyu Amba were major centers facilitating trade between Abyssinia and the Emirate of Harar. In the early 1800s, French trader Charles-Xavier Rochet d'Héricourt remarked that Harar, the principal town of Adal, a region predominantly populated by Somalis was the most significant trading route, as it connected Ifat with the port city of Berbera.

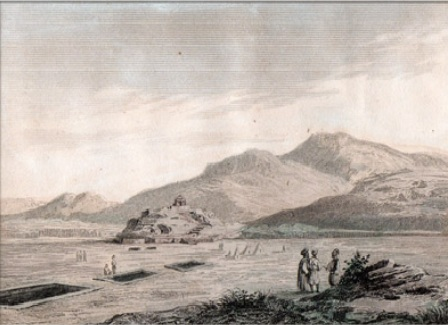
Depiction of the Ifat mountains in 1848 by French artisan Fleury

Under the reign of Shewan king Sahle Selassie, the appointed Muslim Ifat governors were Hussain of Argobba, and his father Walasma Mohamed who professed their origin from the Walasma dynasty of the middle ages. English traveler Henry Salt in 1814 reported Ankober served as the capital of Ifat. Ifat was the site of forceful conversions of Muslims to Christianity by then Shewa king Menelik II under the orders of emperor Yohannes IV. In the 1870s, the Afran Qallo Oromo made a request for support from the Egyptian authorities on behalf of the Muslims of Ifat, as stated in their letter of capitulation during the Egyptian invasion of Harar. French writer Élisée Reclus in 1890 describes the fate of the initial inhabitants and dwellings of Ifat:

As in Abyssinia properly so-called, the Shoa Mahommedans have been forcibly converted. They were formerly very numerous, and the name of Jiberti, by which they are known throughout Abyssinia, is a reminiscence of their holy city of Jabarta in Ifat, which has since disappeared.

In 1896 rebel leader of Ifat, Talha Jafar led a revolt with the support of local Afar, Oromo, Argobba, Warjih and Amhara Muslims in the region, he had also made attempts to reach out to the ruler of Sudan known as the "Khalifah al-Mahdi", this forced Menelik now emperor of Ethiopia to send an army to confront the insurgents. Talha would however successfully negotiate a peace treaty with the emperor which ended hostilities a year later. According to historian Hussein Ahmed, Talha deceived the emperor into presuming he had a large force backing his rebellion, when in fact they were diminutive.

In 1958 Ifat sub-province was called Yifat & Timuga with Menz and Gishe becoming their own zone.

== Ruins ==
In 2007, a French archeologist team discovered numerous ruined towns 20 km east of Shewa Robit near the western bank of the Awash River in the Hari Rasu. The most notable were the towns of Asbari, Nora and Awfāt, the latter identified as being the capital of the former Ifat state. The ancient ruins discovered included a mosque, a reservoir for water, and a necropolis dedicated to the Walashma Dynasty, all dated back to the 14th and 15th centuries. In Asbari and Nora most of the housing were grouped around two large stone mosques, their access was enclosed by walls and a hydrographic system, marked by slight depressions sloping into a thalweg. The funeral epigraphy of the oldest tomb notes that it is of a "sheikh of the Walasma" dated to April 1364, while another is of Sultan Ali ibn Sabr ad-Din dated to June 1373. Sometime in the 16th century, these towns were abandoned, local Argobba accredit Arabs for building the structures. The dwellings resemble Argobba or Harari historical building designs.

Archaeologist Timothy Insoll indicates the Nora archaeological site is conventionally attributed to the period spanning from the thirteenth century through the sixteenth century, characterized by the presence of a significant defensive fortification.

== Inhabitants ==
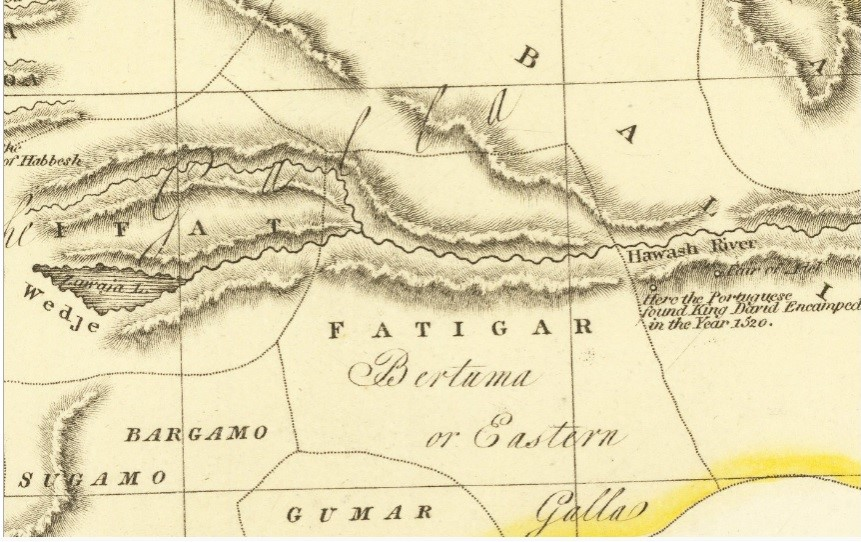
19th-century map by John Pinkerton indicating Ifat region's location north of Wej province and west of Fatagar region

The Argobba people are believed to originate from Ifat and were living alongside the people of Doba in the region. Argobba, Harari, Wolane and Siltʼe people, appear to have represented major populations of Ifat in the Middle Ages. However, Amelie Chekroun suggests no possible link to identify the people of medieval Ifat with the Argobba people. Later the bulk of Ifat's population was said to have consisted of Afar and the Warjih. According to Ethiopian historian Taddesse Tamrat, several groups of people, including some portions of the Harla people, moved further east to Adal under Haqq ad-Din II after the Muslim state of Ifat collapsed as a result of the Christian state's expansion.

The inhabitants of Ifat were the first to be recorded using Khat in the fourteenth century.

Medieval Arabic texts indicate Ethiopian Semitic languages were spoken by the people of Ifat however Cerulli states these speakers were soon replaced by Afar and Somali.

In the early 19th century British diplomat William Cornwallis Harris, who visited the region reported that Ifat and Shewa together consisted of around 1 million Christians and 1.5 million Muslims, in addition to pagans.
