= Biqulzar =

Historic state in Horn of Africa

Biqulzar (Harari: ቡቁልዘር Buqulzär) also spelled as Baqulzar or Bequl zar was a historical region located in eastern Ethiopia. According to Taddesse Tamrat, the state was positioned east of the Awash River however historian Hussein Ahmed, proposes it was a general term for districts east of Amhara region in the fourteenth century.

== Etymology ==
Biqulzar originates from the Harari language meaning “verdure along a stream.” According to British historian George Huntingford, sixteenth century Adalite writer Arab Faqīh in his text Conquest of Abyssinia describes Biqulzar as "a river full of water."

== History ==
According to fourteenth century Arab historian Ibn Fadlallah al-Umari, Biqulzar was one of Ifat's ancient metropolises or regions alongside Kwelgora, Hubat, Gidaya, Hargaya and Fedis.

In the fourteenth century, Ethiopian emperor Amda Seyon fought the Wargar or Warjih people in Biqulzar. According to Salvatore Tsdeschi, in 1332 Amda Seyon had summoned his vassal ruler of Ifat, Jamal ad-Din I in Biqulzar however Manfred Kropp believes Amda Seyon met with a distinct ruler of Biqulzar.
