= Adal (historical region) =

Historic Muslim region in the Horn of Africa

Adal (Harari: ኣው ኢዳል/አብዳል; Somali: Awdal), also known as Aw Idal, Awdal, or Aw Abdal was a historical Muslim region in the Horn of Africa. Located east of Ifat and the Awash river as far as the coast, and including Harar as well as Zeila. The Zeila state often denoted Adal and other Muslim dominions in medieval texts.

== Geography ==
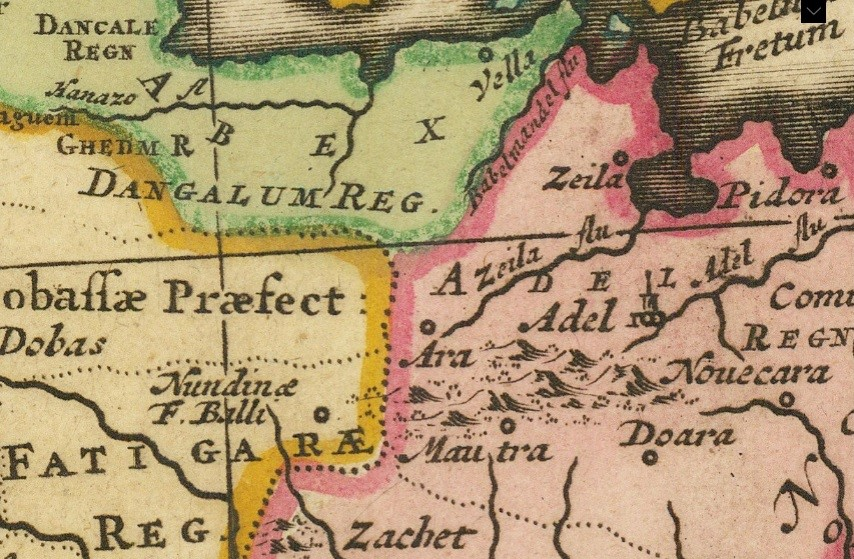
Adal in 1696 bordering Fatagar region to its immediate west and region of Afar in the north west

Adal was situated east of the province of Ifat and was a general term for a region inhabited by Muslims. According to Portuguese explorer Francisco Alvarez, Adal in 1520 bordered on the Abyssinian frontier province of Fatagar in the west and stretched to Cape Guardafui in the east. He further stated that it was confined by the Kingdom of Dankali in the north west and that the leaders of Adal were considered saints by the locals for their warfare with neighboring Abyssinia.

It was used ambiguously in the medieval era to indicate the Muslim inhabitant low land portion east of the Ethiopian Empire. Including north of the Awash River towards Lake Abbe in modern Djibouti–Ethiopia border as well as the territory between Shewa and Zeila to the northwest of Somalia. In addition to Zeila, Leo Africanus also identified the coastal ports of Berbera and Maydh as lying within the dominion of Adal. Districts within Adal included Hubat, Gidaya and Hargaya. It also occasionally included the Hadiya Sultanate.

According to Ewald Wagner, the Adal region was historically the area stretching from Zeila to Harar. In the 1800s Catholic missionary Stanely states Adal is situated west of Zeila. In 1885, French trader Alfred Barday noted that the Adal grassland, which extended to the Awash River, was 'Banan Herer' (Harar plateau) in Somali. Dr. Duri Mohammed asserts the lowlands outside the city of Harar is known as Aw Abdal where Imams traditionally led prayer. According to Amélie Chekroun, Adal designated the region east of the Awash River, replacing Ifat as the Muslim power which had come under Ethiopian Christian control in the 1300s. The Christian state under Menelik II's invasion during the 1800s for the first time in its history maintained control in Adal therefore incorporating it into modern Ethiopia. The region was mostly located in modern-day Awdal and had Zeila as a capital city but also controlled other interior towns like Abasa or Dakkar extending into the Harar plateau to the south-east and modern day Djibouti in the west.

== Semi legendary foundation ==
Eidal (Abdal) becomes Emir of the region succeeding saint Barkhadle in AD 1067 following a victory against a Persian.

After two days he sent some of the horsemen to Hararge to the Sarif Idal, and (this) came (to him) with 150 horsemen. He and the Imam started the war against the army of al-Kanis Mari in the land of Bissidimo. The war broke out for four days until they reached the land of Kurummi. When Sarif Idal reached her, he cut off her head and hung her on lances. She had 200 riders with her, all of whom God quickly sent into the fire of hell. The Imam returned (with) Sarif Idal after killing her and was called Emir Idal. He entered Hararge with 500 riders, praising God and cheering with innumerable and incalculable booty.

— Yahya Nasrallah, Fath Madinat Harar

== History ==
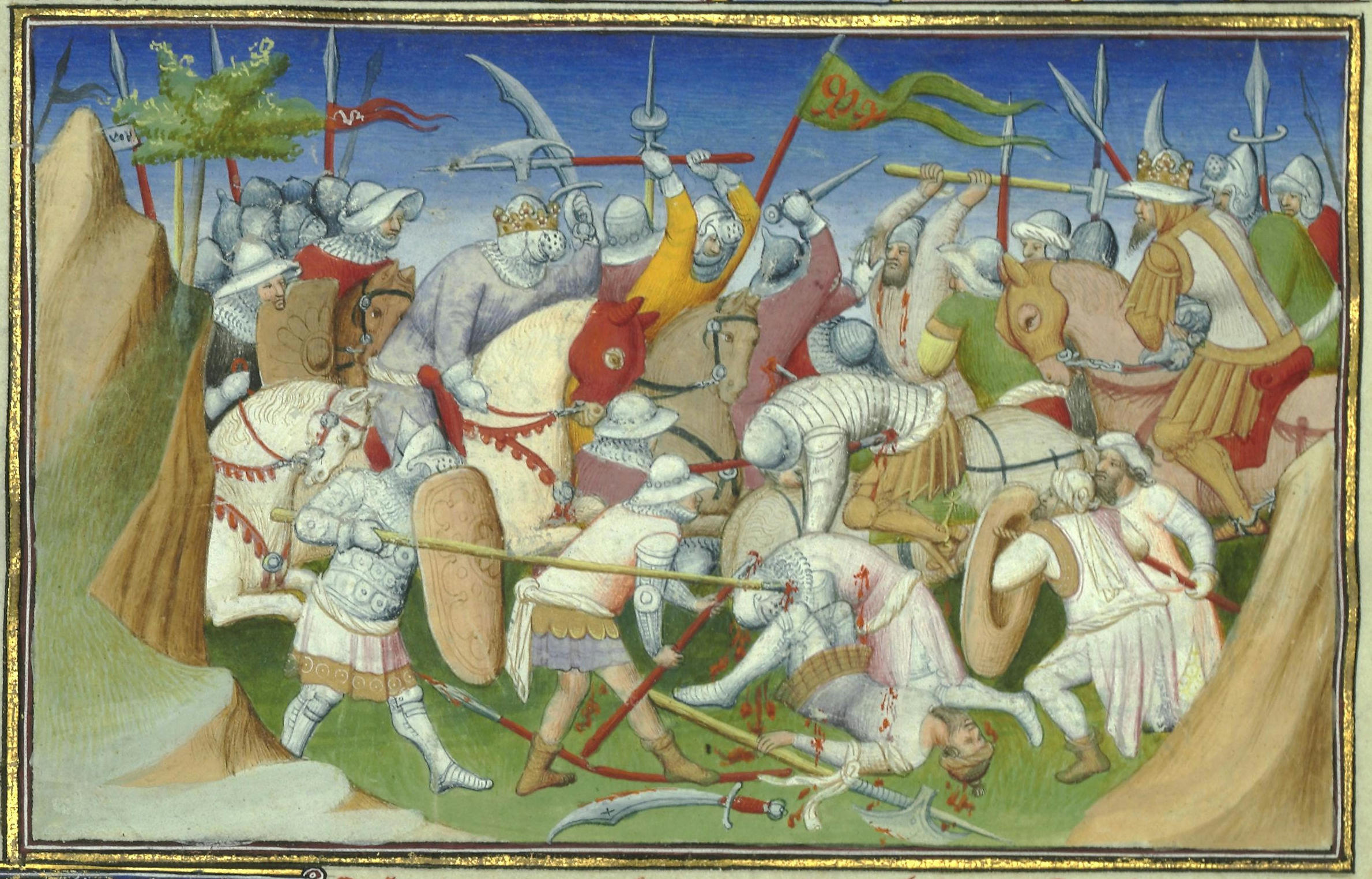
Depiction of the Sultan of Adal (right) and his troops battling King Yagbea-Sion and his men in the thirteenth century.

Islam was first introduced to the area early on from the Arabian Peninsula, shortly after the Hijrah. Zeila's two-mihrab Masjid al-Qiblatayn dates to the 7th century, and is one of the oldest mosques in the world. The earliest reference to Adal was following the collapse of the Makhzumi dynasty in July 1288 when 'Ali Baziyu led a campaign in Adal and Mora which was concluded by the killing of the lords of Adal and Mora, the victorious Sultan then annexed Adal and Mora to his Kingdom. Adal is also mentioned by Marco Polo in 1295 as a state continuously in conflict with Abyssinia. Ongoing religious tensions and occasional military clashes were a feature of the relationship between the Muslims and their Christian neighbours. Marco Polo, recounted the story of an Ethiopian bishop who was abducted by an Islamic leader, presumably the Sultan of Ifat at Zeila, while travelling home from Jerusalem, and forcibly circumcised in accordance with Islamic custom before being released back to Ethiopia.

According to fourteenth century Arab historian Al Umari, Adal was one of the founding regions of the Ifat Sultanate alongside Biqulzar, Shewa, Kwelgora, Shimi, Jamme and Laboo. Its also mentioned by al-Maqrizi as an important region in this era.

In the fourteenth century Emperor Amda Seyon of Ethiopia battled against Adal leader Imam Salih who allied with Jamal ad-Din I of Ifat.

In the late fourteenth century rebel leaders of Ifat Haqq ad-Din II and Sa'ad ad-Din II relocated their base to the Harari plateau in Adal forming a new Sultanate at Dakkar. This new Adal Sultanate encompassed the modern city of Harar. According to Arabic texts Coffee was introduced into Arabia by the Arab brother in-law of Sa'ad ad-Din II, Ali bin Omar al-Shadhili which he became familiar with during his brief stay in Adal. According to Harari tradition numerous Argobba people had fled Ifat and settled around Harar in the Aw Abdal lowlands during their conflict with Abyssinia in the fifteenth century, a gate was thus named after them called the gate of Argobba. In this period the Walasma dynasty of Ifat initiated a series of marriage alliances with the leaders of Adal.

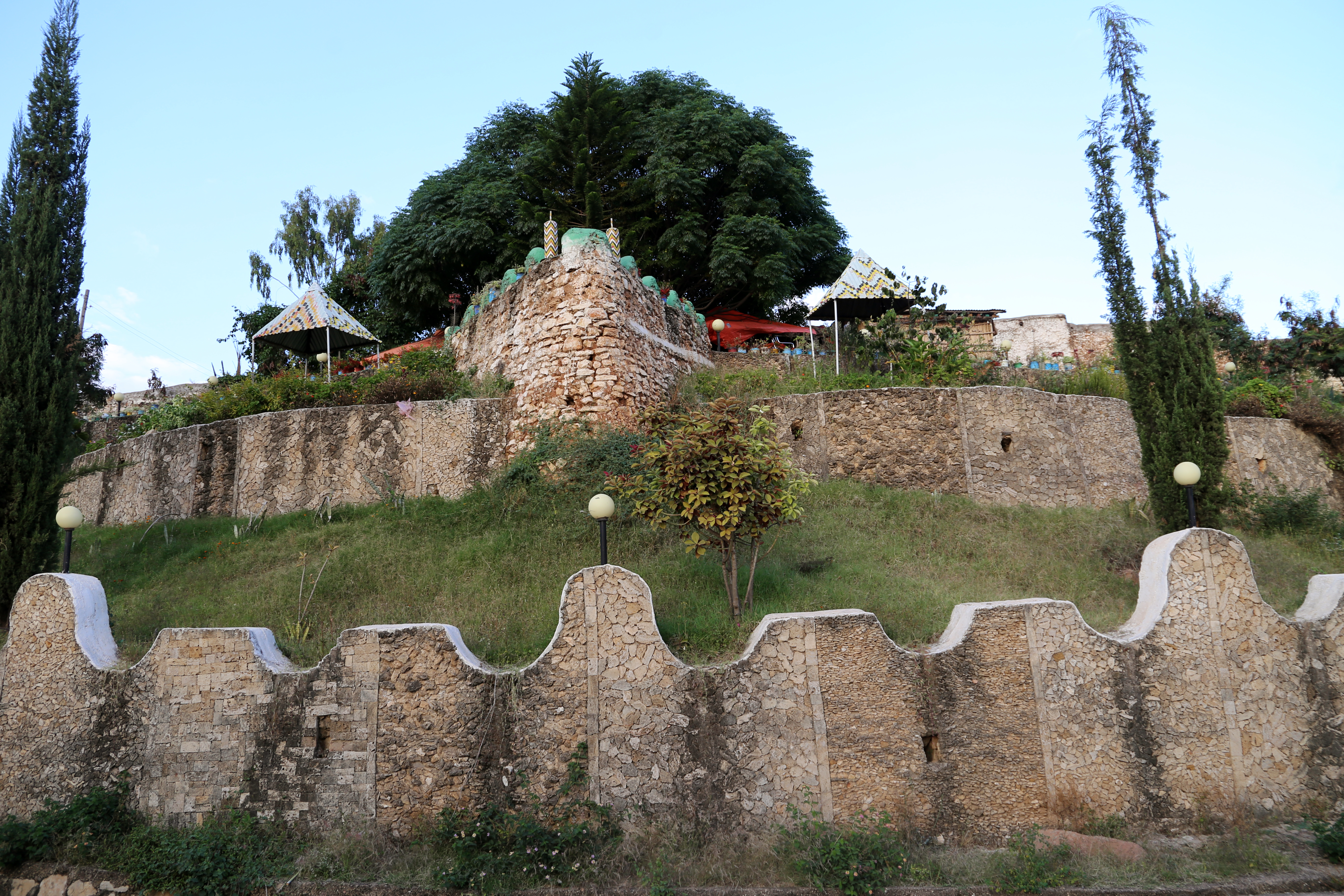
Defensive walls of Harar city erected during the reign of Emir Nur ibn Mujahid

According to Enrico Cerulli, local discontent for the Walasma dynasty of Ifat which occupied Adal region led to the rise of Ahmed ibn Ibrahim al-Ghazi in the sixteenth century. Up until the end of the sixteenth century, the rulers of Adal were in a raging conflict with the leaders of neighboring Christian state of Ethiopian Empire. In the ensuing Oromo invasions, Adal split into two states, the Aussa Sultanate of Adal and Harar Emirate of Adal, the latter surviving up until the nineteenth century.

The French writer Pierre d’Avity stated in the 17th century that Harar was the chief town of the region, and was located in the ninth degree of altitude; he further described the region as having a perimeter of about six hundred and seventy-two leagues. Later in the eighteenth century Scottish travelor James Bruce gives a description of Adal:

Aussa is now no separate kingdom, but dependant on Harar ; the race of people was from Harar, and therefore they are not subject to strangers. They are called Mellassua, and still preserve their language, which is the same with that of the Gibbertis. They count up 317 kings. From this city was Mahomet Gragne. The whole country is Adel; from Zeila to Harar is 8 days journey; but Zeila is now little inhabited, on account of the faithlessness of the natives in robbing the Jelalib. Soomal is governed by a chief at peace with Adel. Harar, the capital of Adel, has 99 villages, all governed each by a vizir, and pay tribute.

Adal had friendly trade relations with Abyssinia during the reign of Sahle Selassie in early 1840s which led to a delegate from Harar referred to as "Abdal Wanag" (lion of Adal) administrating the Abyssinian town of Aliyu Amba. Nineteenth century French trader Charles-Xavier Rochet d'Héricourt remarked that Harar, the principal town of Adal, a region predominantly populated by Somalis was the most significant trading route, as it connected Ifat with the port city of Berbera. In 1842 British traveler Charles Johnston described Harar as the last city of Adal. Adal state would be annexed by Ethiopia in the late 1800s during Menelik II's invasion after the Battle of Chelenqo.

In the 1900s, the designated emperor of Ethiopia, Lij Iyasu, entered into marriage alliances with the peoples of Adal. He married the daughter of a Somali noble, the daughter of an Afar descended from Abubakr Ibrahim Chehem, the governor of Ottoman Zeila, and the daughter of Abdullahi Sadiq, a Harari aristocrat.

== Inhabitants ==
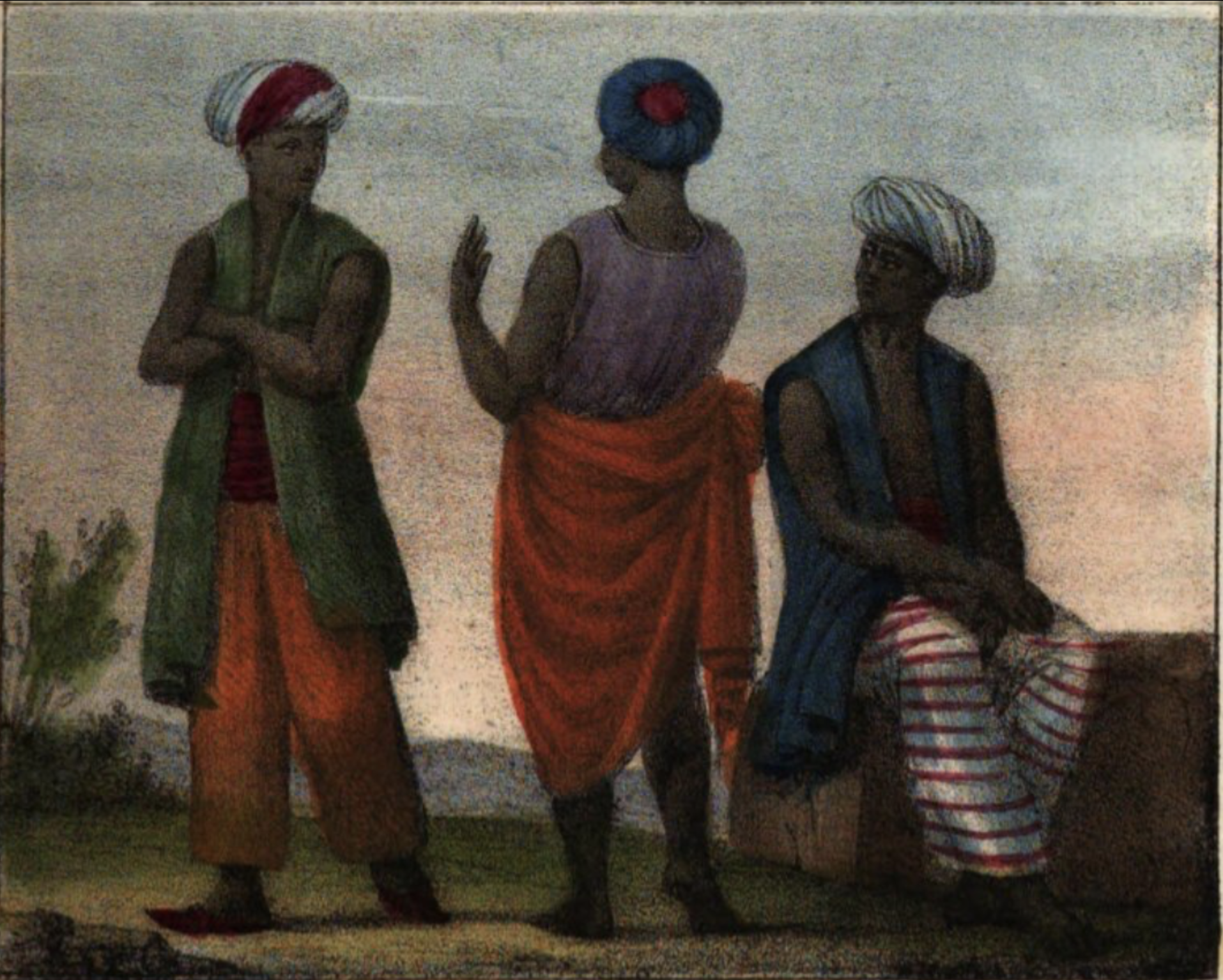
Traditional costumes of the inhabitants of Adal by Giuseppe Antonelli in 1838

The city of Zeila was originally the center of power and commerce in the Adal region. The bustling port city was predominantly inhabited by Somalis, as well as Arabs and Afars.

Clans of Adal mentioned in the fourteenth century Emperor Amda Seyon I chronicles during the Ethiopian invasion included; Wargar, T’iqo, P’aguma, Labakala and Gabala.

In the fifteenth century Emperor Zara Yaqob chronicle, the Harla people are mentioned as the traders of Adal. Harla are considered to be the main population of Adal. However, according to historian Enrico Cerulli, Harla people who originate from the Harari region were assimilated by Somalis following the decline of the Adal principalities. Harla inhabitants of Adal occupied modern Afar Region in Ethiopia also suffered similar fates by adopting Afar identity in the seventeenth century.

According to Professor Lapiso Gedelebo, the contemporary Harari people are heirs to the ancient Semitic-speaking peoples of the Adal region. According to Robert Fey, the language spoken by the people of Adal as well as its rulers the Imams and Sultans would closely resemble contemporary Harari language. According to Bahru Zewde and others the Walasma state of Adal in the fourteenth century primarily included the Semitic-speaking Harari and Argobba people, however it also began including some portions of Somali and Afar people. The agriculture-practicing population of Adal were exclusively Harla and Harari people. According to archaeologist Jorge Rodriguez and Anaïs Wion, the Somalis were periphery peoples of the Adal state.

== Gallery ==
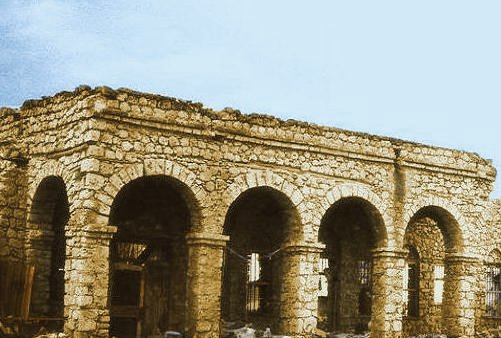
Zeila ruins

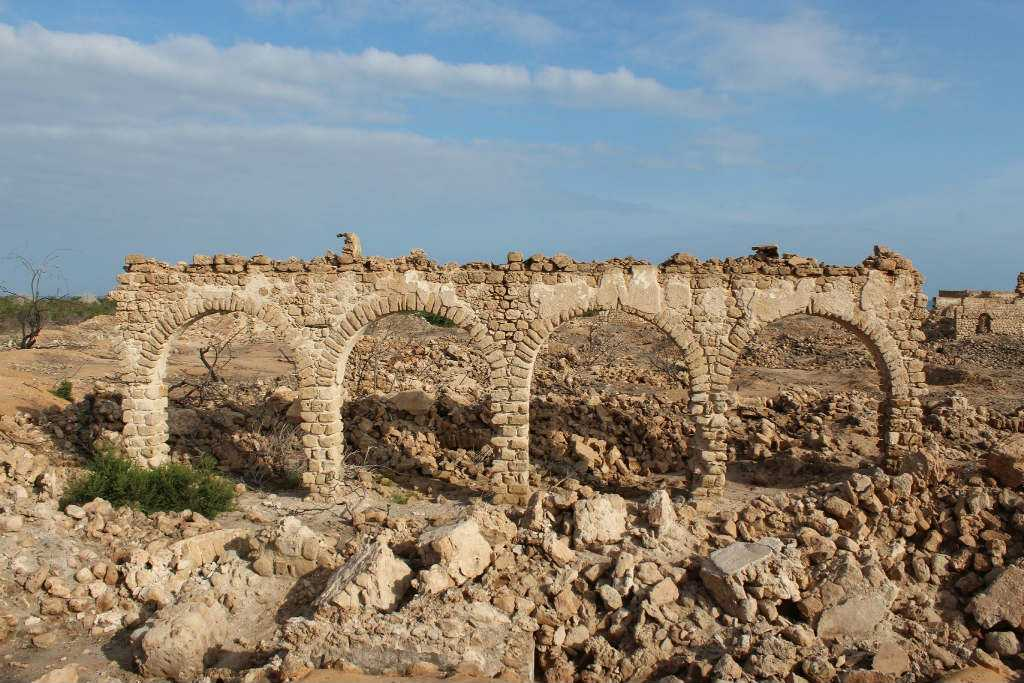
Bulhar ruins

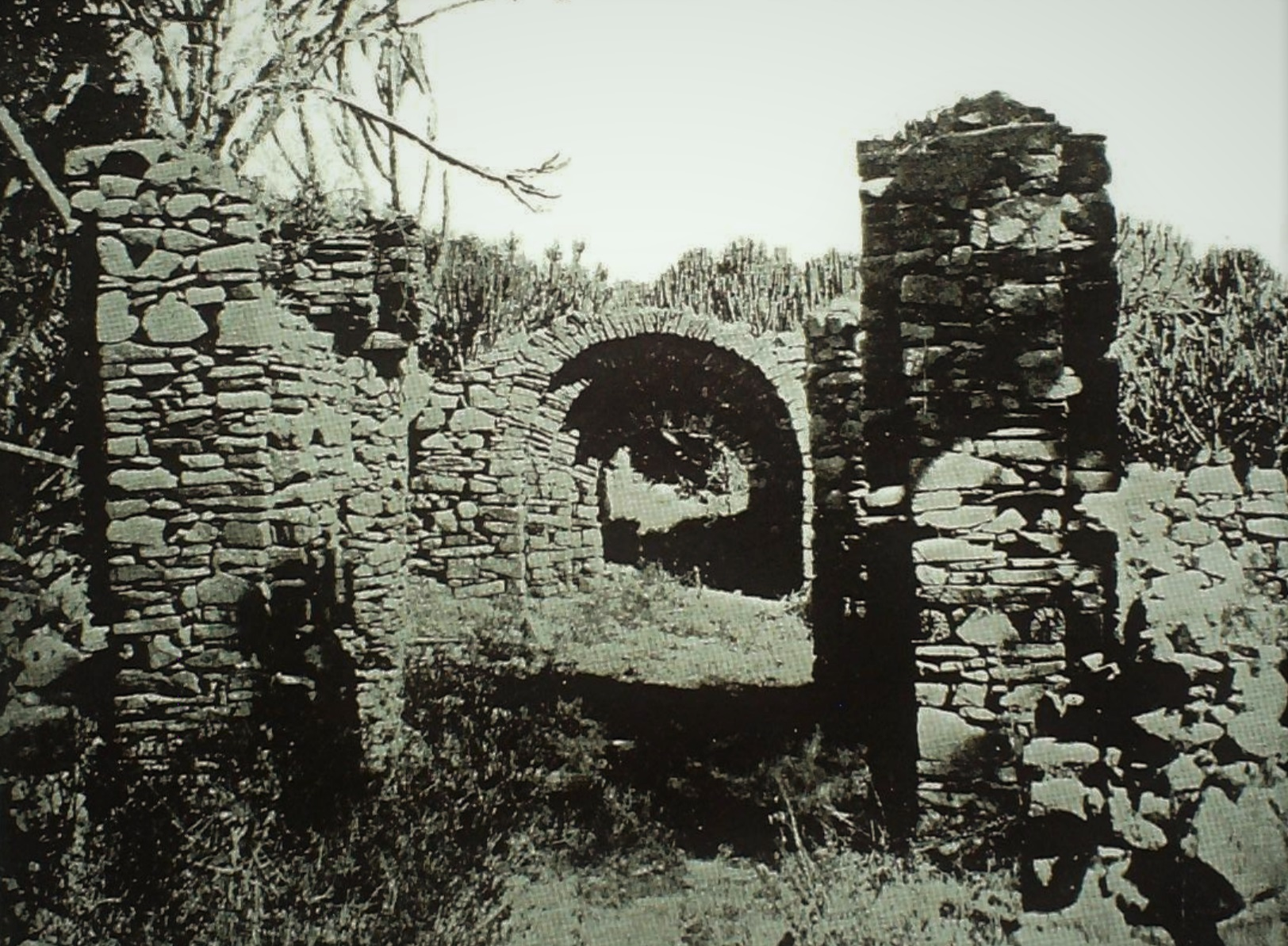
Abasa ruins

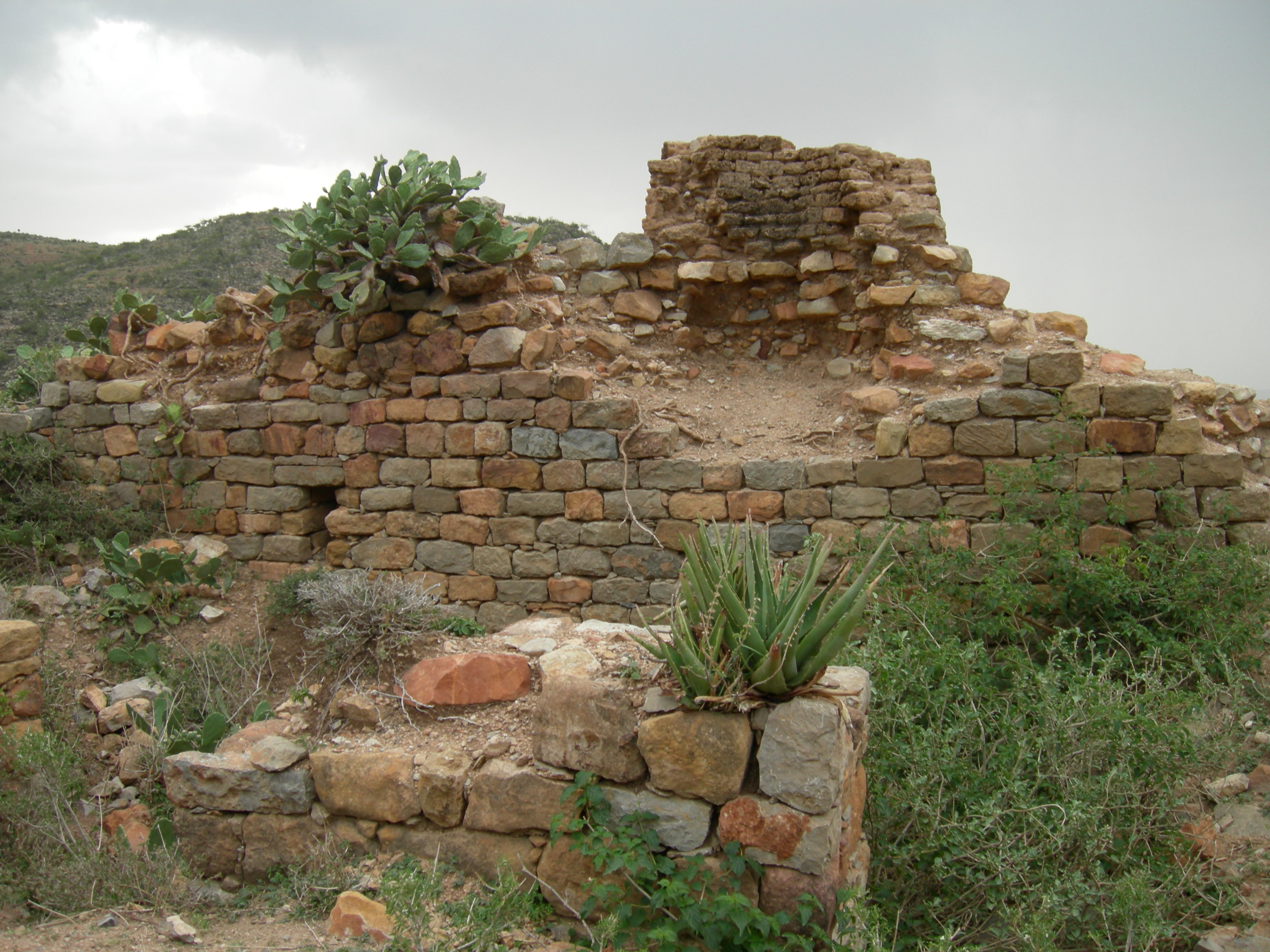
Harla town of Hubat ruins near Dire Dawa

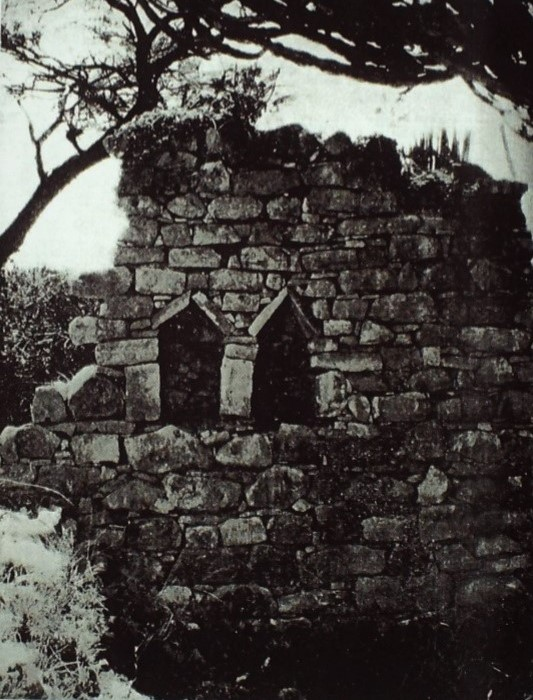
Amud ruins

== See also ==
- Derbiga, ruin in Adal
- Abd al Kuri, island near Adal
