= Gendebelo =

- Interactive map of Gendebelo
- 9°51′30″N 40°15′21″E
- Type: City
- Location: Ethiopia

Site notes
- Archaeologists: François-Xavier Fauvelle-Aymar; Bertrand Hirsch
- Discovered: 2009

Gendebelo (also called Gende Belo and Nora) was an ancient Muslim trading city in Ifat (present-day central Ethiopia). Its location was discovered in 2009 by a team of French archaeologists.

== History ==
Gendebelo was a medieval Muslim trading center thought to be lost. It was believed to be situated about 30 kilometres (19 mi) from Ankober. Gendebelo was "a great mercantile city", where camel caravans transversing through Adal brought all kinds of Indian spices except ginger (which was grown locally) from the Adal port of Zeila. It was governed by the Walasma dynasty.

In the sixteenth century the city is referenced in the work Futuh al-Habasha by Adalite author Sihab ad-Din Ahmad during Adal's invasion of Abyssinia. Historian Mohammed Hassen states that the Adalites utilized the gold contributed by the inhabitants of Gendebelo to procure weapons, which was essential for their triumph in the Battle of Shimbra Kure against the Abyssinians.

== Discovery ==
In 2009, French archaeologists François-Xavier Fauvelle-Aymar and Bertrand Hirsch discovered the site as a medieval city now known as Nora, which has been abandoned for years except for the mosque.

An old Ajami manuscript helped the archaeologists determine the city's location. Italian scholar and Ethiopia expert Enrico Cerulli had found the manuscript in the Muslim city of Harar in 1936, where it was being used to wrap sugar. The archaeologists also used the writings of Alessandro Zorzi, a 16th-century Venetian explorer who had found the ruins of Gendebelo in the desert and referred to it as "the place where mules are to be unloaded and camels take over."
