= Hargaya =

Historic state in modern Ethiopia

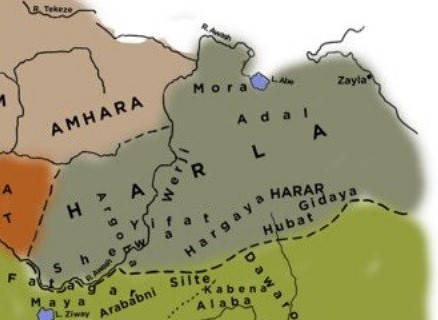
Location of Hargaya state in the middle ages

Hargaya (Harari: ሀርጋየ Härgāyä) was a historical Muslim state in present-day eastern Ethiopia. It was located east of the Awash River on the Harar plateau in Adal alongside Gidaya and Hubat states. It neighbored other polities in the medieval era including Ifat, Fedis, Mora, Biqulzar and Kwelgora.

== History ==
The people of Hargaya were reportedly a sub clan of the Harla people. In the fourteenth century Hargaya elected Imam Salih to battle the forces of Abyssinian emperor Amda Seyon I. According to the fifteenth century emperor of Ethiopia's Baeda Maryam I chronicle, Hargaya's ruler took the title Garad.

According to sixteenth century Adal writer Arab Faqīh, the people of Hargaya fought in the army of Ahmed ibn Ibrahim al-Ghazi leader of Adal Sultanate. The text Futuh al-Habasha asserts Hargaya's overlord was Adal leader imam Ahmed's brother Muhammad ibn Ibrahim. Amelie Chekroun states Hargaya people were presented as an independent group in the sixteenth century not associated with the Somalis. Historian Merid Wolde Aregay deduced that the Hargaya state language was Harari. In the later half of the sixteenth century Hargaya state would be ravaged by the Oromo invasions. Researcher Mahdi Gadid states Hargaya alongside Gidaya domains were primarily inhabited by the Harari people before being assimilated by the Oromo and Somali people.

An Oromo Garad of Hargaya and a Malak of the Nole community were among the governors of the area, according to the Emirate of Harar's 19th-century documents.
