= Gidaya =

Historic state in modern Ethiopia

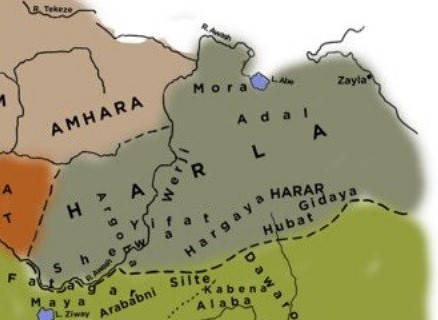
Location of Gidaya state in the middle ages based on historian Dr. Lapiso Delebo's description

Gidaya (Harari: ጊዳየ Gidāyä; Somali: Gidaaya), also known as Gedaya or Jidaya, was a historical Muslim state located around present-day eastern Ethiopia. The state was positioned on the Harar plateau and a district of Adal region alongside Hargaya and Hubat polities. It neighbored other states in the medieval era including Ifat, Mora, Hadiya, Fatagar, Biqulzar, Fedis and Kwelgora.

== History ==
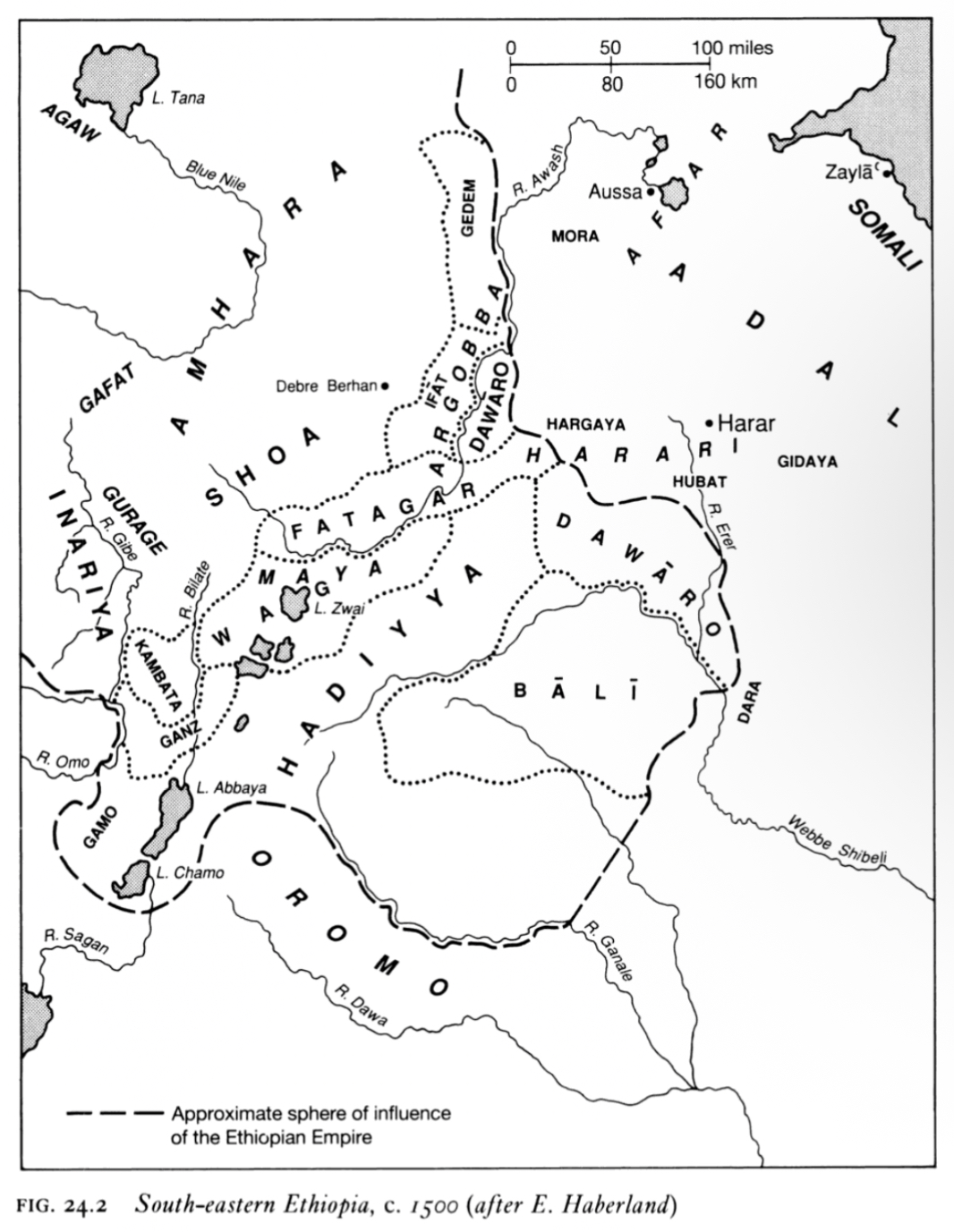
Location of Gidaya state in the middle ages by Bethwell Allan Ogot

According to Dr. Lapiso Gedelebo, Gidaya was one of the Islamic states that had developed in the Horn of Africa from the ninth to fourteenth centuries. The people of Gidaya were reportedly a sub clan of the Harla people. The earliest mention of Gidaya state is during its conflict with the Makhzumi dynasty in 1266. In the thirteenth century the Arab writer al-Mufaḍḍal mentions the king of Gidaya was named Yûsuf ibn Arsamâyah.

In 1285 Walasma dynasty crushed a rebellion led by Gidaya which allied with Shewa to revive the Makhzumi state. In the fourteenth century it was under the Ifat Sultanate and later the Adal Sultanate with its leader known as the Garad.

According to sixteenth century Adal writer Arab Faqīh, the people of Gidaya were part of the army of Ahmad ibn Ibrahim al-Ghazi during the Ethiopian-Adal war. Ulrich Braukamper suggests that Gidaya may be linked to the Giri clan, which comprises a diverse population of Somali and Oromo descent referenced in the Futuh al-Habasha. This group currently resides in the vicinity of Jigjiga, which is believed to be the historical site of the Gidaya state. Historian Amelie Chekroun however states Gidaya people in the Futuh al-Habasha text were presented as an independent group not associated with Somalis.

Towns within Gidaya and other states such as Sim were reportedly surrounded by ramparts by the late sixteenth century. The name Gidaya still exists as a surname in Harar, and according to researcher Mahdi Gadid, Gidaya state was primarily inhabited by Harari people before being assimilated by the Oromo and Somali people. Historian Merid Wolde Aregay deduced that the Gidaya state language was Harari. According to Harari records Gidaya state collapsed due to the Oromo migrations and famine.

== Legacy ==
- Aw Gidaya is considered a saint in Harar.

== See also ==
- Jidwaq (clan)
