= Kwelgora =

Historic state in Horn of Africa

Kwelgora also spelled as Kuelgora was a historical Muslim region located in central Ethiopia, it was bounded by the Ifat and Makhzumi state. The locality was in the vicinity of Aliyu Amba and southward of Ankober.

== History ==
In the thirteenth century the Arab historian Ibn Sa'id al-Maghribi states the people within reach of this state were in conflict with both the Nubians and Abyssinians.

Fourteenth century Arab historian Ibn Fadlallah al-Umari states Kwelgora was a part of the Ifat Sultanate. According to the so-called fourteenth century Amda Seyon chronicles, Kwelgora was invaded and pillaged by the emperor's troops alongside other Muslim dominions such as Biqulzar, Hubat, Gidaya, Hargaya and Fedis.
