= Old Harari =

Earliest historical form of Harari language

Old Harari or Ancient Harari is the earliest recorded form of the Harari language, spoken in Harar, Ethiopia. It used the Arabic script.

== History ==
Historian Ewald Wagner posited that Old Harari could uncover a common ancestry linking southern Ethiosemitic and Eastern Cushitic languages. The early Zikr text is linked to Sayo Abdulmalik, who composed it in Old Harari. Tradition holds that Abdulmalik resided during the era of Abadir in the 11th century. Certain terms within the Harari language have been recognized in the lexicon compilation from the fourteenth century by the Egyptian historian Al-Mufaddal ibn Abi al-Fada'il. According to philologist Alessandro Bausi, the earliest known manuscript featuring a text in Old Harari dates back to 1460.

Historian Mohamed Nuuh Ali, who specializes in Somali studies, suggests that there are indications that Old Harari loanwords in Somali language stem from the western expansion of the Somali people.

Subsequently, Middle Harari later emerged, characterized as a blend of both Modern and Old Harari.

Linguist Giorgio Banti asserts that there is a common belief regarding the connection between the Harari language and the East Gurage languages, including Silt'e. However, this assertion is incorrect, as Old Harari is more similar to Modern Harari than to any of the East Gurage languages.
