= Wargar =

Clan in Ethiopia

The Wargar (Harari: ወርጋር) also spelled as Wergar were a clan inhabiting the Adal region.

== History ==
First mentioned in the fourteenth century chronicles of Emperor Amda Seyon I of Ethiopia as allies of Imam Salih.

In the sixteenth century, the overlord of Zeila Wargar ibn Abogn, accompanied Adal leader Ahmed ibn Ibrahim al-Ghazi during the Ethiopian-Adal War.

Wargar is described as a Harla sub clan within the Harari people. According to Harari tradition, it was then that, to defend themselves, seven clans of the neighbouring villages united against a common adversary, including Wargar, to form a Harar city-state. The title Wargar persisted in the post seventeenth century state Emirate of Harar's fringes. The Warjih people who previously inhabited the Harari region, today reside in Shewa and are commonly referred to as Wargar.

== See also ==
- Warsangali, Harti Somali clan
- Wardiq, Issa Somali clan
