= Hubat =

Historic state in modern Ethiopia

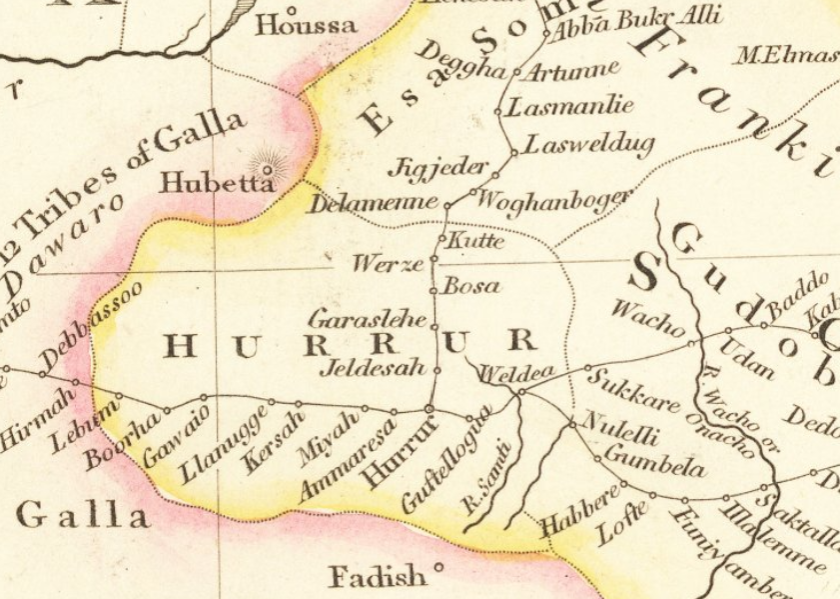
1832 map by John Arrowsmith illustrating Hubetta's location in the Emirate of Harar

Hubat (Harari: ሆበት Hobät), also known as Hobat, or Kubat was a historical Muslim state located in present-day eastern Ethiopia. Historically part of the Adal region alongside Gidaya and Hargaya states on the Harar plateau. Hubat is today within a district known as Adare Qadima which includes Garamuelta and its surroundings in Oromia region. The area is 30 km north west of Harar city at Hubeta, according to historian George Huntingford. Trimingham locates it as the region between Harar and Jaldessa. Archaeologist Timothy Insoll considers Harla town to be Hubat the capital of the now defunct Harla Kingdom.

== History ==
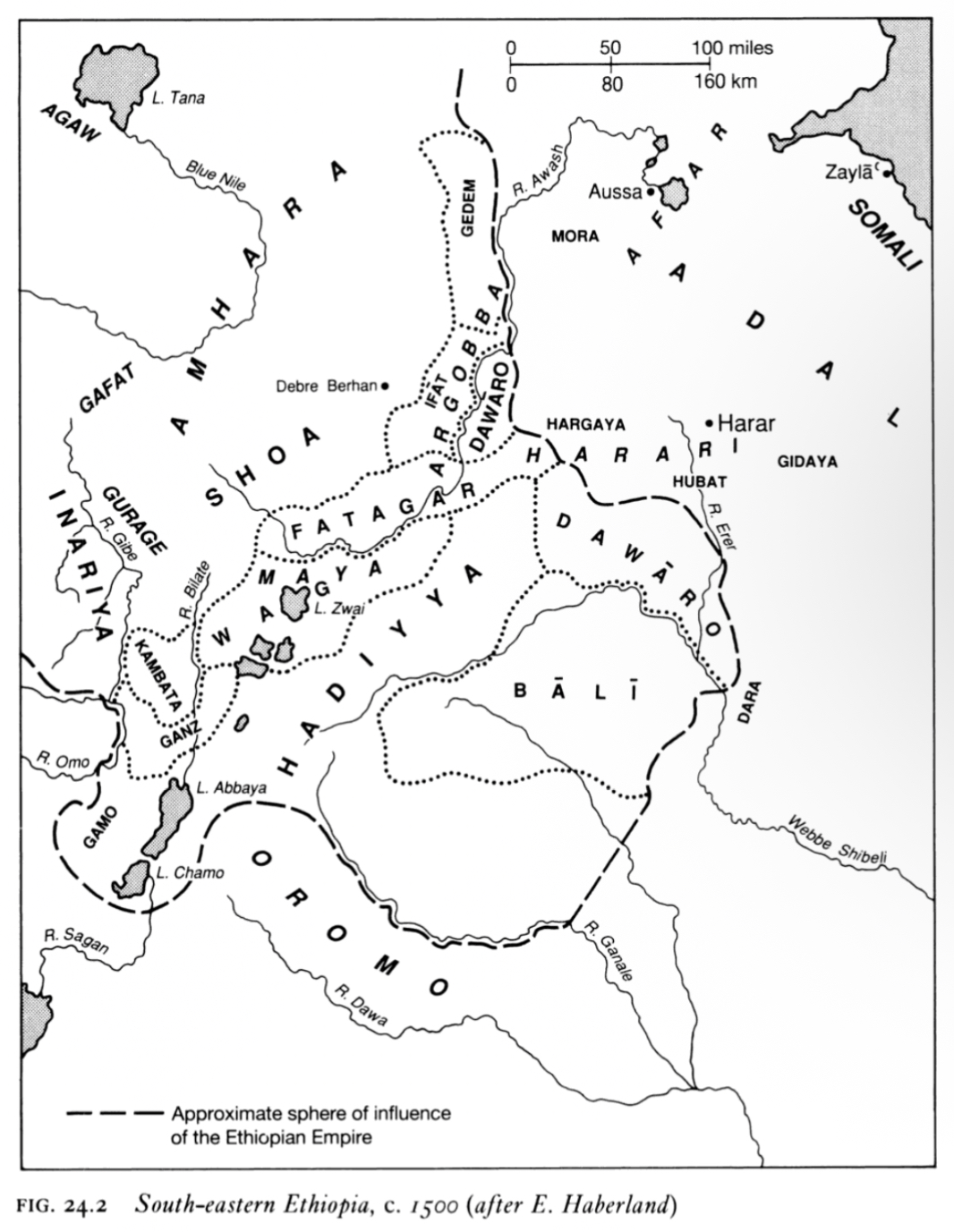
Location of Hubat in the middle ages by Bethwell Allan Ogot

According to Dr. Lapiso Gedelebo, Hubat was one of the Islamic states that had developed in the Horn of Africa from the ninth to fourteenth centuries. In 1288 AD Sultan Wali Asma of the Ifat Sultanate invaded Hubat following collapse of the Makḥzūmī dynasty. Hubat was also invaded by Ethiopian Emperor Amda Seyon in the early 1300s. Hubat was an Ifat protectorate in the fourteenth century and an autonomous state within Adal Sultanate in the fifteenth century.

According to Mohammed Hassen, Hubat was the stronghold of the Harla people and center of operations for fifteenth century Adal Emir Garad Abogn ibn Adish. A siege of Hubat took place in the early sixteenth century led by the Adal Sultan Abu Bakr ibn Muhammad against rebel leader Garad Umar Din.

The sixteenth-century ruler of Adal who conquered Abyssinia, Ahmad ibn Ibrahim al-Ghazi, was born in Hubat. In his early career Ahmed defeated an Abyssinian militia at the Battle of Hubat led by Degalhan a general of Emperor Dawit II. Ahmed Ibrahim also achieved a second stunning victory over an Abyssinian raiding party led by Fanuel in Hubat which gained him fame. Merid Wolde Aregay states the Hubat and Harla principalities demonstrated ability to defeat Abyssinians meant it was necessary to replace Sultan Badlay's descendants. Hubat would later play an important role for Ahmad ibn Ibrahim in his struggle against Adal Sultan Abu Bakr ibn Muhammad. According to sixteenth century Adal writer Arab Faqīh, the ruler of Hubat was Abu Bakr Qecchin during the Ethiopian-Adal war.

Hubat was invaded and settled by the Barento Oromo in the following centuries who came at loggerheads with the Adal Sultanate. The Emirate of Harar the successor state of Adal would continue to influence the region as numerous Oromo people converted to Islam during the reign of emir Muhammad and this trend even continued following the Abyssinian annexation of the region.

== Ruins ==
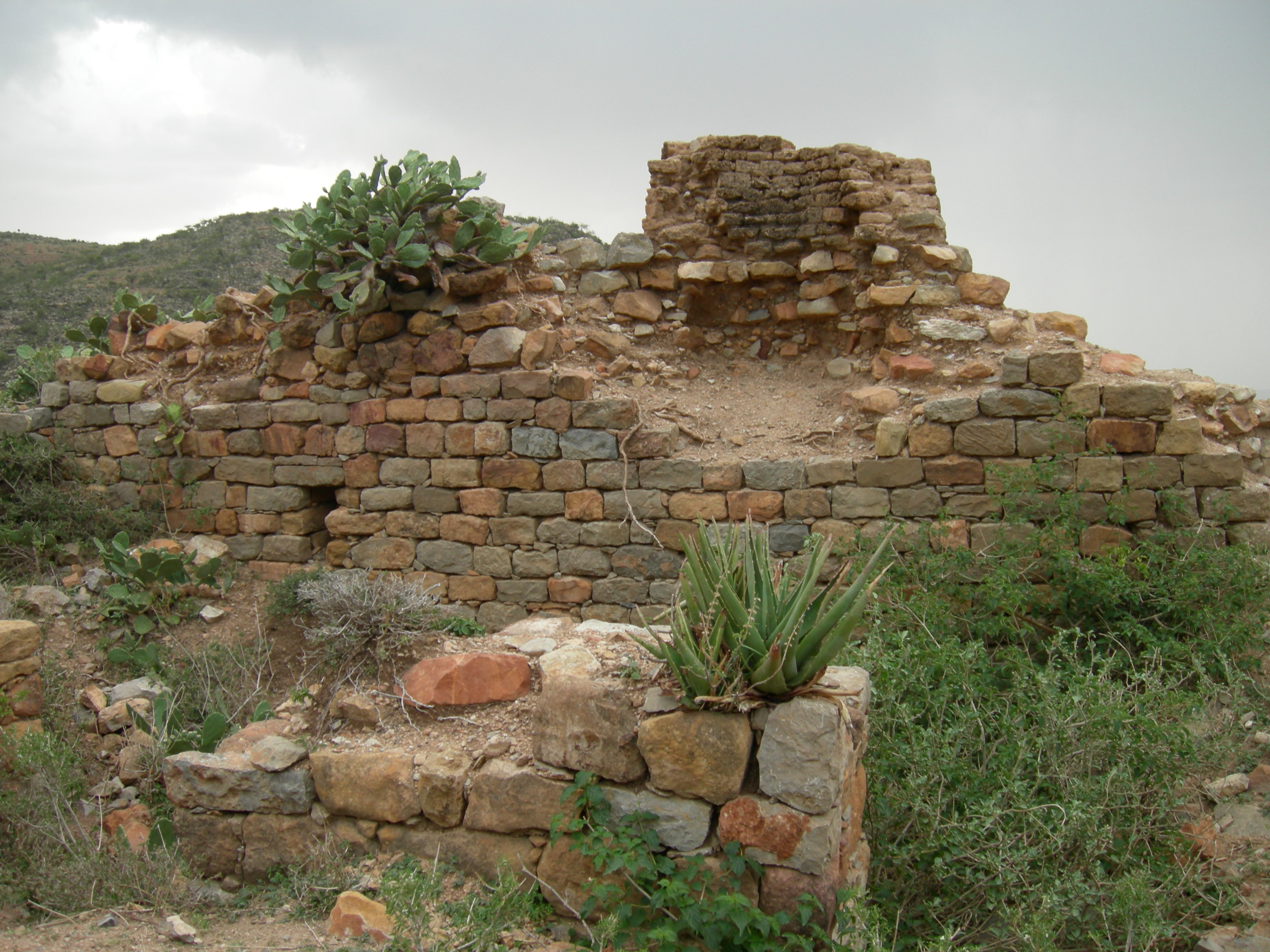
Ruins of Hubat near Dire Dawa

Ceramics produced locally in Hubat have been discovered to be closely associated with those found in the ruins of Chercher and Harlaa.

== Notable residents ==
- Ahmed ibn Ibrahim al-Ghazi, Emir/Imam of Adal Sultanate
- Abu Bakr Qecchin, general of the Adal Sultanate and chief of Hubat

== See also ==
- Gidaya, neighboring state
