= Argobba Bari =

One of the five ancient gates of Harar, Ethiopia

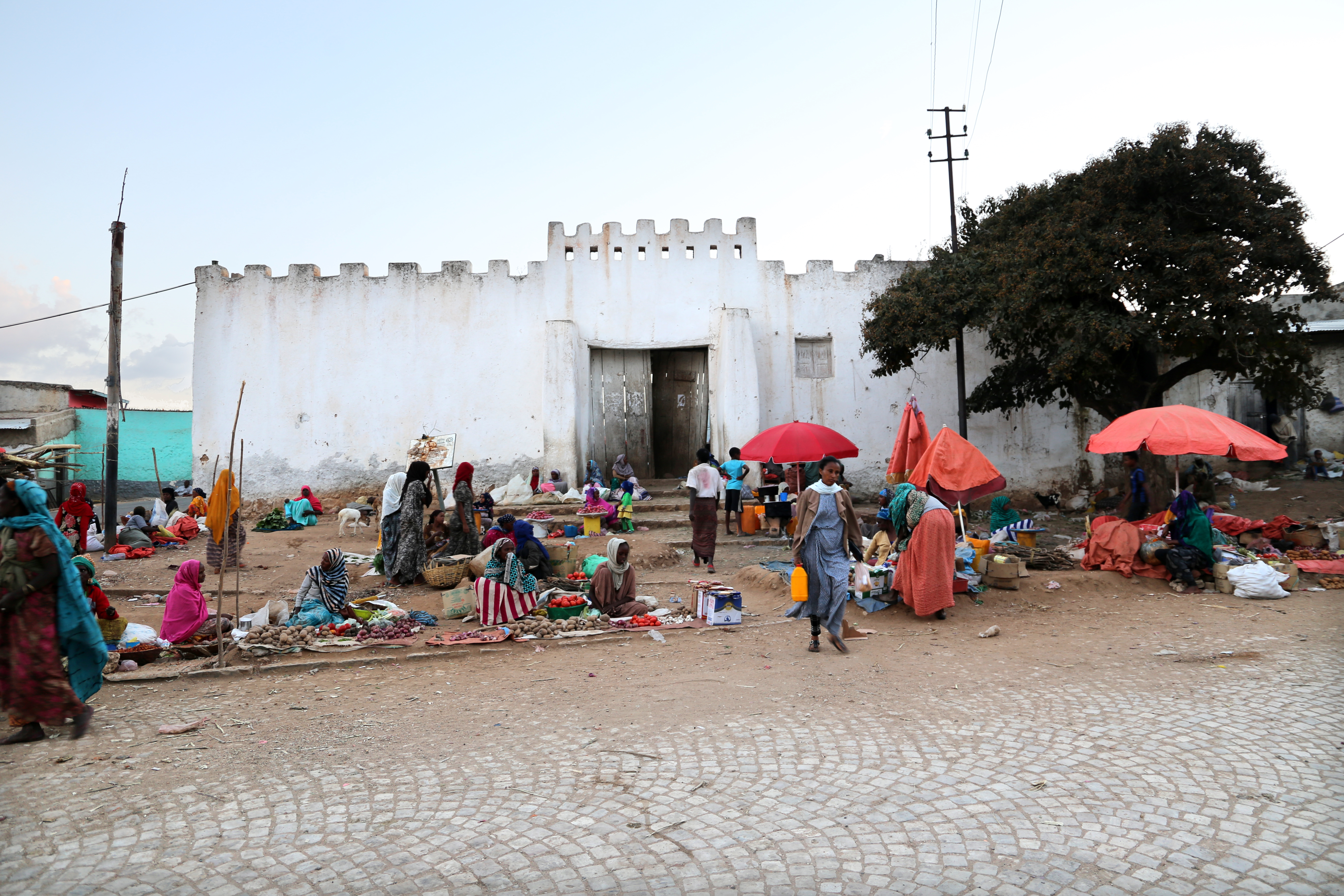
Argobba Bari

Argobba Bari, more commonly known as Argob Bari meaning "Argobba gate" is one of five ancient gates of Harar, Ethiopia. This gate is also known as the gate of compassion.

== History ==
The gate, which is now located in the eastern part of the Old City, was named in memory of the Argobba people who fled from Ifat during their conflict with Abyssinia in the fifteenth century and settled outside the town of the lowlands in Aw Abdal.

During the nineteenth century, the gate served as a passage for traders traveling to and from Berbera.
