= Harla people =

Extinct ethnic group of Ethiopia, Djibouti and Somalia

Regions with significant populations

Languages
- Harla

Religion
- Islam

Related ethnic groups
- Harari, Argobba, Somalis, Afar, Siltʼe, Wolane and Zay

The Harla, also known as Harala, or Karala, were an ethnic group that once inhabited Ethiopia, Somalia, and Djibouti. They spoke the Harla language, which belonged to either the Cushitic or Semitic branches of the Afroasiatic family.

== History ==
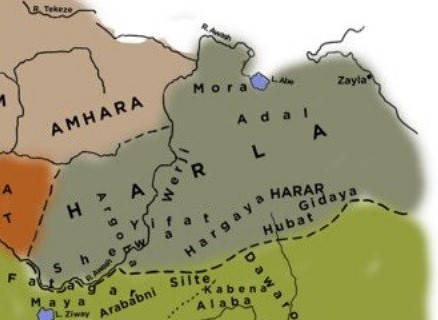
Harla people's population distribution in the middle ages

The Harla are credited by the present-day inhabitants of parts of Ethiopia, Somalia, and Djibouti with having constructed various historical sites. Although now mostly lying in ruins, these structures include stone necropoleis, store pits, mosques and houses. Cave drawings are also attributed to the Harla.

Tradition states one of Harla's main towns was Metehara and the area between Harar and Dire Dawa is still referred to as Harla. The Harla inhabited Chercher and various other areas in the Horn of Africa, where they erected various tumuli. According to historian Richard Wilding, tales indicate Harla lived in the interior of Ogaden and by the seashores prior to Somali and Oromo movements into these regions.

The Harla Kingdom existed as early as the sixth century; it would later be influenced by Islam sometime in the eighth century. Archaeological sites associated with the Harla reveal camel bone remains in the oldest layers, suggesting an initial foundation of the settlements by a camel-herding pastoralist population. A lowland orientation for Harlaa is further indicated by the food remains recovered at the site, which show a lack of reliance on highland staples such as injera and kisra. In the ninth century, the earliest known Muslim kingdom in the Horn of Africa, the Maḥzūmī dynasty sprang up in Harla country. The Maḥzūmī capital of Walale was in Northern Hararghe. Harla state leaders were commonly known as Garad and their religious elite carried the honorific title Kabir.

According to folklore, the Harla reportedly had a queen named Arawelo, who ruled much of the eastern parts of the Horn of Africa. In Zeila, a clan called Harla claims to be related to the ancient people. Locals in Zeila also attested that the old town of Amud was built by the Harla.

The influx of Arab immigrants such as Ābadir ʻUmar Āl-Rida into Harla territory would lead to the development of the town of Harar, known then as Gēy. Harar would become the leading center of Islam in the Horn of Africa. Archaeologist Timothy Insoll discovered stoneware in Harla town resembling that found in Harar.

According to the Harari chronicle, Abadir led prayer as Imam and inquired about the states grim condition.

After the prayer nobody stayed in the mosque except for the crowd mentioned (from Mecca). They asked each other: 'What is it about us? We see neither their emir nor their vizir. Rather, they are all of one rank. Then a man of them said: 'I also heard from them (the natives) that 25 years prior, they were a people, the Harla, until death destroyed them and they scattered, fleeing from disease and famine.

— Yahya Nasrallah, Fath Madinat Harar

=== Conflict and decline ===
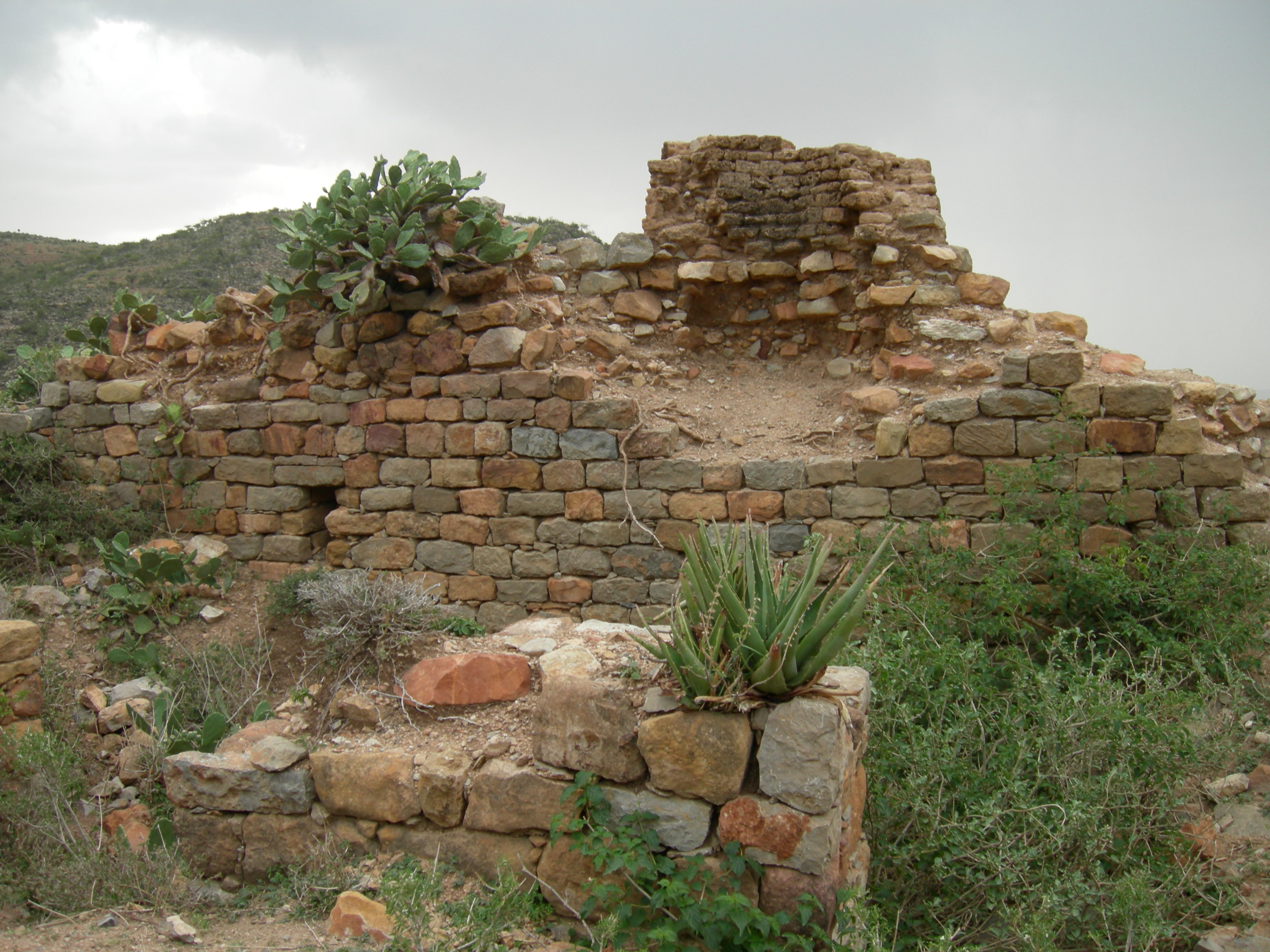
Ruins of a thirteenth century Harla town of Hubat near Dire Dawa

According to thirteenth century Arab geographer Ibn Sa'id al-Maghribi, the country of Harla was east of the Ethiopian Empire and north of Zanj. Harla clans descendant from Sa'ad ad-Din II participated in the sixteenth century Ethiopian–Adal War. Ibn Said further states the Harla territory passed the Blue Nile, north east and ended near the shores, the Harla made a living in the gold and silver mines.

According to Ethiopian accounts, in the 14th century, the Harla led by their Imam Salih allied with the Ifat Sultanate and battled the forces of emperor Amda Seyon I in what is now northern Somalia. In the 15th century, Emperor Zara Yaqob of Ethiopia sold several Abba Estifanos of Gwendagwende supporters to Harla slave traders of Adal as punishment for joining the Stephanite sect labelled heretic by the Ethiopian Orthodox Tewahedo Church. A power struggle had developed in the early 16th century between Harla/Karla emirs of Harar and Walashma dynasty in which Ahmad ibn Ibrahim al-Ghazi would assume power by executing the Walashma Sultan Abu Bakr ibn Muhammad.

According to Adal writer Arab Faqīh, in the middle of the 16th century, the Adal Sultanate led by Harla and their Somali allies invaded Abyssinia. Harla were part of Adal's elite military unit called the Malassay. The Ethiopian–Adal War was in response to the death of Harla leader of Adal, Imam Mahfuz, killed in single combat, by the warrior-monk Gebre Andrias in the early reign of Emperor Dawit II. According to Chekroun, during the war the Harla clans were organized in a manner similar to the Somali clans. In the wars against Emperor Sarsa Dengel, the Harla were led by the Sultan Muhammad ibn Nasir.

The late sixteenth century saw the Oromo people penetrate portions of Ethiopia and Somalia, expansively invading upward from the Lower Jubba eventually incorporating Harla territory. The Harla would move the Adal capital to the oasis of Aussa in 1577, and later establish the Imamate of Aussa before being overthrown by the Afar dynasty of Mudaito in the eighteenth century. In 1893 British led expeditions, came across an ancient town in Nugaal Valley, Somalia, the local Dhulbahante clan alleged the Harla had lived in the area before the Oromo invasions. In 2017, a Harla town that produced jewelry was discovered by archaeologists. The architecture of a mosque found affirmed Harla had ties with Islamic centers in Tanzania and Somalia. The Harla tribe's disappearance could have been due to the Ethiopian–Adal War in the sixteenth century, destitution, or assimilation.

Strong evidence suggests that during the Oromo migrations, the remaining Harla retreated behind the walls of Harar and were able to survive culturally. Local folklore from the Harla village near Dire Dawa, however, claim the Harla were farmers from the Ogaden and went extinct because of their arrogance, refusing to fast in Ramadan, and attempts to have the Quran written in Harla, hence were cursed by God. According to the Gadabuursi clan, the Harla committed major sins through excessive pride. According to another local tradition from the Harar region, the Harla were decimated by a combination of famine and plague. Enrico Cerulli and others state Harla were a distinct group originating from the Harari region; however, due to the collapse of Adal, they were assimilated by Somalis as well as Afars. According to Pavel Červíček and Ulrich Braukämper, local tradition from the Harar region indicates that the Harla had already met their demise prior to the Oromo incursions into the area.

== Affiliated clans ==
The Harari people are considered to be the closest remaining link to the Harla people, as the Hararis were founded by seven Harla clans. Harar and its inhabitants are the only remnant of the old Harla civilization. According to Hararis, the Harari ethnic group consist of seven Harla subclans: Abogn, Adish, Awari’, Gidaya, Gatur, Hargaya, and Wargar. Some sources claim Harla were a less Semitic version of the Harari. Other sources state the Harla were a mixed Harari–Somali population.

The Silte people are also believed to be the descendants of the Harla people. Harari, Silte and Zay are the only people who speak a language that is related to Harla.

The Hadiya people, associated with the Hadiya Sultanate, have been connected with the Harla people in some sources, but this remains unsubstantiated.

Many Somali clans mention they are of Harla descent. Most particularly the Issa subclan of the Dir. Within the Issa, the Harla were assimilated into two clan divisions. The first being the Horroone clan division, where they are called Harla, and they are also found within the Eeleye clan division as Bah Harla and Harla Muse. The Issa traditions regarding the induction of the Harla groups revolve around saint Aw Barkhadle and the Wardiq sub clan.

Sihab ad-Din Ahmad bin Abd al-Qader's Futuh al-Habasha describes a distinct ethnic origin of the Harla, and according to Christian Bader; there is not enough evidence to suggest that they were of Somali descent. Although modern traditions connect Harla to Abdirahman bin Isma'il al-Jabarti and the Darod, forefathers of the Ogaden clan. The Darod sub clan Harti and Geri are furthermore according to tradition, the brothers of Harla. In the modern era, the Harla people have been reduced to insignificance under the Somali Darod clan. According to historian Ali Jimale Ahmed, the surviving remnants of the Harla dwelling in the Harar region were absorbed by Darod Somalis after the sixteenth century.

According to some sources, the Karrayyu and Ittu clans are regarded as Oromos with Harla descent. Ittu had occupied the Chercher region from the Harari people and perhaps also Harla. It is believed the extinct Harla were incorporated into Karrayyu and Ittu in eastern Shewa as well as west Hararghe.

The Afar also have tribes linked to Harla descent called Kabirtu. The Kabirtu Afar, descended from the Harla, maintain a Somali genealogy linking them to the Kablallah Kombe Darod. In the seventeenth century the Harla of Afar Region were assimilated by Afar people following the collapse of Adal Sultanate. In Afar region, clans named after Harla are still found among farmers in Aussa, and Awash district between Dubti and Afambo. The moniker of clans proposes a fusion between native and immigrating tribes.

== Language ==
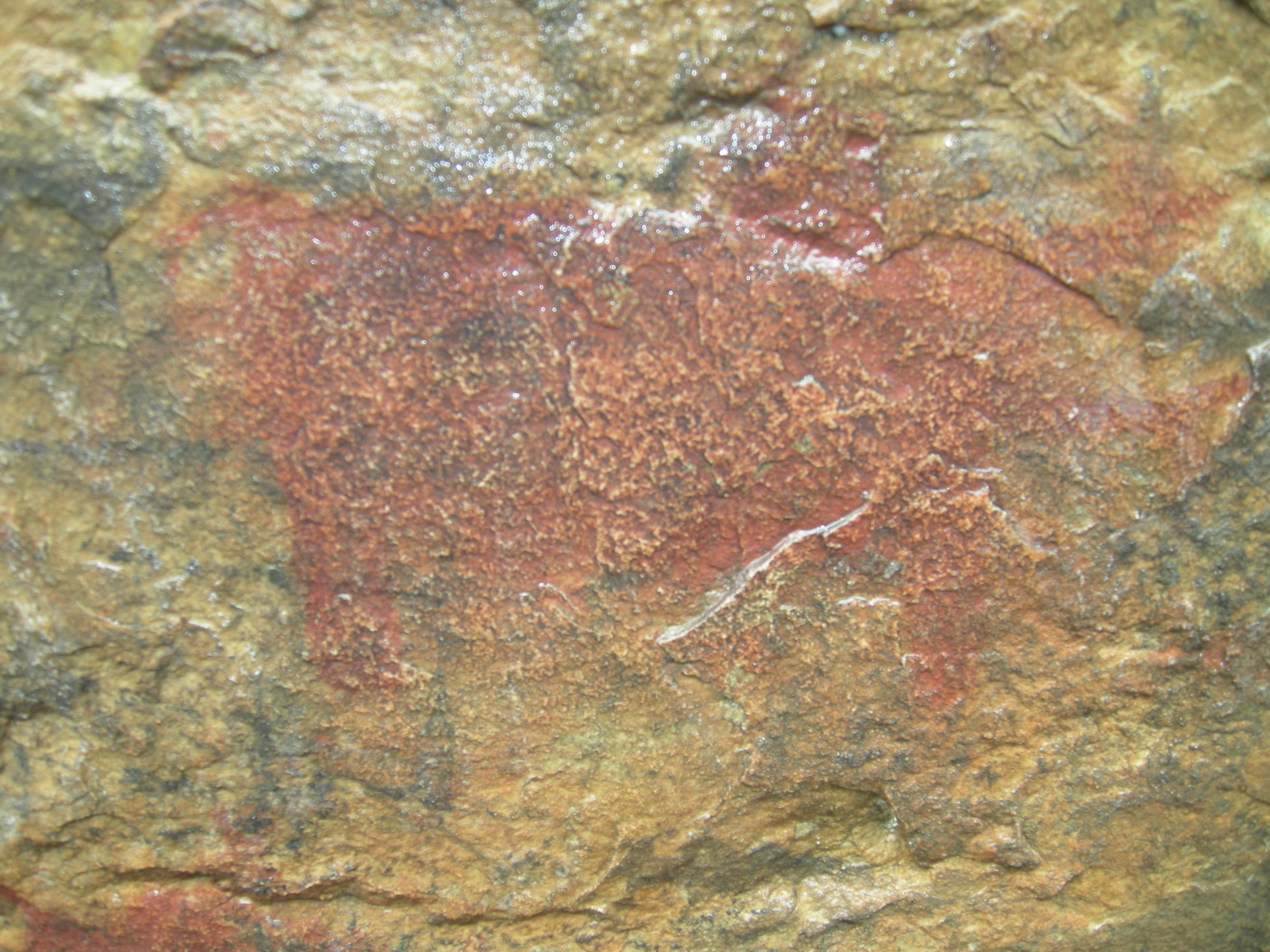
Cave painting attributed to Harla near Harar

According to historian Richard Wilding Harla were ancient Cushitic. However ethnologist Ulrich Braukämper suggests a Semitic variation which he labels "Harala-Harari" later developed in the Islamic period. Harala-Harari speakers were evidently disrupted by the Oromo migrations, leading to isolated related Semitic languages of Harari surviving in the walled city of Harar, Zay language on the island of Lake Zway and in parts of eastern Gurage territory such as Siltʼe language.

Nicholas Tait proposes Harla language was indistinguishable with Argobba and Harari linguistic classifications. Ewald Wagner believes Harla were Semitic speakers related to Harari and Silte languages.

Field research by Enrico Cerulli identified a modern group called the "Harla" living amongst the Somali in the region between the cities of Harar and Jijiga. Encyclopaedia Aethiopica suggests that this population "may be a remnant group of the old [Harla], that integrated into the Somali genealogical system, but kept a partially separate identity by developing a language of their own." Cerulli published some data on this Harla community's language, called af Harlaad, which resembled the Somali languages spoken by the Yibir and Madhiban low-caste groups. According to Barbara Wenger, the dialect's core vocabulary is Somali, and as Swadesh notes, core vocabulary is rarely borrowed from a foreign language.

== See also ==
Derbiga, ruin in Adal
