= Wardiq =

Somali clan

The Wardiq (sometimes spelled Wardiiq, or Wardik) is Somali clan of the wider Issa family.

== History ==
The Wardiq are thought to be descendants of Aws, particularly Abadir (Sheekhal) and Barkhadle. Certain accounts from the Issa suggest that they initially belonged to the Habr Je'lo, a sub-clan of the Isaaq, prior to being adopted by the Issa. Traditions also link the Wardiq with the narratives involving the ancient Harla people.

The Issa clan possesses the esteemed title of Ughaz, which is exclusively conferred upon members of the Wardiq.

== See also ==
- Issa
- Sheekhal
- Wargar
