= Salih (imam) =

Leader of Adal

Salih was the leader of Adal in the fourteenth century. He was commonly known as Qadi or Imam of the Harar territory.

== Militant Career ==
Salih is known for resisting the invasion of Adal by Emperor Amda Seyon I. Despite their alliance tension between Ifat and Adal leaders was evident as Salih refused to wait for the arrival of Ifat's troops under sultan Jamal ad-Din I before attacking the Abyssinians in order to avoid allocating the spoils of war with Ifat. Taddesse Tamrat argues Salih diminished Sultan Jamal of Ifat's power as he had gained the confidence of Muslims in the region.

== Death ==
Salih and his Harla supporters were however defeated at the Battle of Das in which Salih was himself killed by Emperor Amda Seyon’s army.

In 1621 Salih's tomb was rediscovered in Harar.
