= Sultanate of Shewa =

896–1286 Muslim kingdom in modern Ethiopia

- 896–1286
- The Sultanate of Shewa at its height under Sulṭān Malasmaʿī.
- Capital: Walalah
- Official languages: Arabic
- Common languages: Harla; Argobba
- Religion: Sunni Islam
- Government: Absolute monarchy
- Sultan
  - 896–928 (first): Haboba
  - 1279 (last): ʿAbdallah
- History
  - Established: 896
  - Shewa conquered by Ifat: 1278–1285
  - Sultanate of Shewa annexed by Ifat: 1285
  - Disestablished: 1286
- Currency: Dinar
Preceded by	Succeeded by
Harla Kingdom; Kingdom of Aksum	Sultanate of Ifat; Ethiopian Empire
- Today part of: Ethiopia

The Sultanate of Shewa (also spelled Sultanate of Shoa), also known as the Makhzumi Sultanate, was a Muslim kingdom in present-day Ethiopia. It was founded by the Makhzumi dynasty, which originated from the Arab Banu Makhzum. Its capital Walale was situated in northern Hararghe in Harla country. Its territory extended possibly to areas west of the Awash River. The port of Zeila may have influenced the kingdom. The rise of the Makhzumi state at the same time resulted in the decline of the Kingdom of Axum. Several engravings dating back to the 13th century showing the presence of the kingdom are found in Chelenqo, Bate, Harla near Dire Dawa and Munesa near Lake Langano.

== History ==
The Shewa sultanate was one of the oldest documented Muslim states in the region. The state ran along Muslim trade lines and dominions known to the Arab world as the country of Zeila. Its founding dynastic family, the Makhzumis, is said to have consisted of Arab immigrants who arrived in Shewa during the 7th century. This ruling house governed the polity from AH 283/CE 896 to 1285–86, a period of three hundred and ninety years. The Makhzumi dynasty reigned until it was deposed by the Walashma dynasty of Ifat (1285–1415). Ifat was once the easternmost district of Shewa Sultanate. In 1285 Ali b. Wali Asma deposed the kings of Shewa and installed a certain MHz. According to historian Mohammed Hassen, one of the main reasons for Shewa's decline was due to conflict with the Kingdom of Damot. Damot was a powerful state by the 13th century that forced the Sultanate of Shewa to pay tributes.

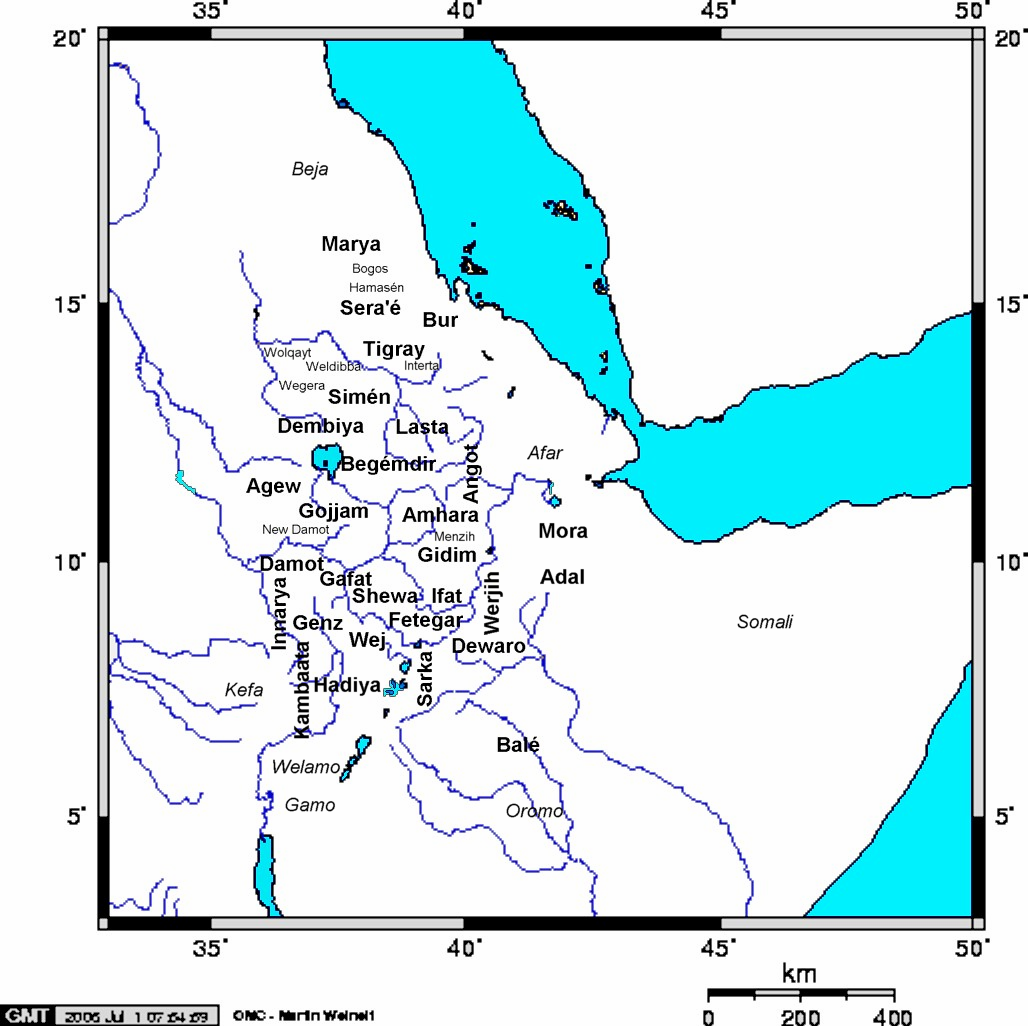
A map showing the center of the medieval Shoa Sultanate

Shewa Sultanate, established in 896, is the first Muslim state inland and according to the chronicle of the sultanate no major report of conversion to Islam was reported before the beginning of the 12th century. However, beginning with the conversion of the Gbbh people in 1108, whom Trimingham suggested them being the ancestors of Argobba, other people were converted. By mid fourteenth century Islam expanded in the region and the inhabitants leaving north of Awash river were the Muslim people of Zaber and Midra Zega (located south of modern Merhabete); the Argobba (Gabal), the Werji people); Tegulat & Menz people whom at that time were Muslims. The chronicle of Shewa sultanate also mentions that in 1128 the Amhara fled from the land of Werjih people whom at that time were pastoralist people and lived in the Awash valley east of Shoan plateau. According to medieval Islamic manuscripts, Makhzumis governed Al-Habash for four centuries.

This dating of 896 (283 AH) comes from a single retrospective entry toward the end of the Dikr at-tawārīḫ (the "Chronicle of Šawah"), an Arabic text identified by Enrico Cerulli in 1936 and published by him in 1941. The Dikr at-tawārīḫ itself survives in a manuscript collection whose sole dating, found in the colophon of another text in the same manuscript, is 1863. It records that the Maḥzūmī dynasty ruled Šawah for 390 years, commencing from 283 AH; Cerulli notes that the difference between 283 and 684 is actually 401 years, not 390, and suggests this may have been a scribal error, with the dating of 896 simply being "what tradition held." The text provides virtually no information about its early period except for some isolated references: the death of Queen Badīt in 1063, the conversion of "Gbbah" to Islam in 1108, and the death (not accession, as sometimes thought) of Sultan Malasmaʿī of Gbbah in 1183.

The historian Taddesse Tamrat put this in the context of a longer tradition of Christian domination in the region going back to Aksumite times, during which Muslims were predominantly involved in trade as protected subjects of local pagan or Christian kings rather than as an independent political power; he noted the 1063 death of Queen Badit as the first historically verifiable tradition of Muslims in eastern Shewa, more than a century after the chronicle's claimed founding date.

Ifat or Yifat, established in early medieval times, was the easternmost district of Shewa Sultanate and was located in the strategic position between the central highlands and the Sea, especially the port of Zeila. In 1285 Ifat's ruler Wali Asma deposed Shewan kings and established the Walasma dynasty and Shewa with its districts including its centers, Walalah and Tegulat, became one of the seven districts of Ifat sultanate. Welela, previously the capital of Shewa Sultanate, is situated on a mountain 24 km north of Debre Berhan, located in today's North Shewa Zone (Amhara), and was known by Muslims as mar'ade which later became the seat of emperor Amda Tsion. The chronicle of Amde Sion mentions Khat being widely consumed by Muslims in the city of Marade.

Based on Cerulli's study of the names of the princes J. D. Fage and Roland Oliver were convinced that the inhabitants of Shewa spoke Ethiopian Semitic language likely Argobba language. Argobba are widely believed to be the first to accept Islam collectively, in the Horn of Africa, and lead expansions into various regions under the Sultanate of Shewa. Argobba and Harla seem to have relied on each other in the Islamic period. After Shewa was incorporated into Ifat an Egyptian courtier, Al Umari, would describe Ifat Sultanate as one of the largest as well as the richest of Ethiopias Muslim provinces, and Shewa, Adal, Jamma, Lao and Shimi are places incorporated into Ifat.

A study in 2020 proposed that Shewa was not a unified Sultanate but rather a collection of smaller, autonomous political entities.

== List of sultans ==
There were nine recorded sulṭāns of Shewa, who asserted descent from Wudd ibn Hisham al-Makhzumi. Although Makhzumi rulers names found initially in Harar are Arabic, other texts found elsewhere at a later date use traditional Ethiopian Semitic names alternatively.

	Ruler Name	Reign	Note
1	Amir Haboba	896–928	Earliest documented ruler of Hararghe. Haboba is unable to quell tribal conflicts, appeals to the Abbasid caliphate for mediators. Abdicates in favor of Abbasid mediating party leader Abadir.
2	Amir Umar	???–???	Known as Father (Aw) Abadir Umar ar-Rida. Resolves tribal issues. Proselytized as far as Mogadishu. Several tribes in the Horn of Africa venerate Abadir. The beginning of the Harari dynasty of rulers. Tomb in Harar.
3	Amir Muhiaddin	???–???	Known as Father (Aw) Barkhedle Yusuf bin Ahmad al-Kawneyn. Proselytized as far as Maldives and Sri Lanka. Venerated by various tribes in the Horn of Africa and South Asia. Was said to be a Somali. Tomb near Hargeisa.
4	Amir Eidal	???–???	Known as Father (Aw) Abdal.
5	Amir Maya	???–???	He is succeeded by his daughter.
6	Queen Badit	???–1063	Daughter of King Maya, possibly Gudit who destroyed the Axum state Harar chronicles lists her as Tedin Bint Maya Lama Badit is stated to be a usurper as Islamic law prohibits female rulers. Historian Ewald Wagner suggests that her family heritage might be associated with Haramaya region. The Harari tradition characterizes her as a leader who is fond of warfare. The Emirate in Harar transitions from emirate to sultanate after the death of Badit.
7	Sulṭān Malasmaʿī	1180–1183	
8	Sulṭān Ḥusein	1183–1193	He is from Gidaya state.
10	Sulṭān ʿAbdallah	1193–1235	
11	Sulṭān Maḥamed	1235–1239	Son of Sulṭān Ḥusein.
12	Sulṭān Ganah	1252–1262	The qāḍī of the state Faqih Ibrahim al-Hassan of Sawa writes about the fall of the Abbasid caliphate to the Mongol Empire in 1258.
13	Sulṭān Mālzarrah	1239–1252	Son of Sulṭān Maḥamed. Married Fatimah Aydargun, daughter of Sulṭān ʿAli "Baziwi" ʿUmar of Ifat in 1245, and mother of Sultan Dilmārrah.
14	Sulṭān Girām-Gaz'i	1262–1263	Son of Sulṭān Ganah. The only other ruler in the region to hold the title Gazi "conqueror", aside from Ahmad ibn Ibrahim al-Ghazi. Abdicated in favor of his elder brother.
15	Sulṭān Dilmārrah	1263–1278	Dil Mārrah literally "Guide to the victory" in Harari and Argobba as well as other Ethiopian Semitic languages spoken by Christians of northern Ethiopia. The state was in conflict with the people of Gidaya, Mora and Gabarge. Son of Sulṭān Mālzarrah. Internal conflict, he was deposed by Dil Gamis. He was half-Walashma on his mother's side, and also married a Walashma princess. According to Harari texts a drought hit the Sultanate in 1272 killing a large number of the aristocracy and its rulers within two years.
16	Sulṭān Dil-Gāmis	1269–1283	Assumes the Christian Axumite royal title "Dil" last used by Dil Na'od. In 1270 Yekuno Amlak establishes Solomonic dynasty in the west with the assistance of Gafat mercenaries and Dil Gamis, whom provided aid to Amlak giving him an advantage over Zagwe. According to Arabic texts found in Harar the previous ruler Dil-Marrah sought assistance from Yekuno Amlak in restoring his rule, and was briefly restored to the throne in July 1278, but was deposed again by August. The Axumite title "Dil" would not be used again until the 16th century by Bati del Wambara.
17	Sulṭān ʿAbdallah	1279–1279	Son of Sulṭān Ganah. Briefly deposed Sulṭān Dilmārrah to restore the rule of the sons of Ganah. However, this rebellion was short lived, and Shewa would be annexed into Ifat the following year.

== See also ==
- Ethiopia in the Middle Ages
- History of the Horn of Africa
- Sultanate of Adal
