= Futuh al-Habasha =

History book by Arab Faqih (16th century CE)

- Author: Arab Faqih
- Original title: فتوح الحبشة
- Language: Arabic
- Subject: Islamic history, Conquests
- Genre: Non-fiction
- Media type: Print (Hardcover & Paperback)

Futūh al-Habasha ("Conquest of the Abyssinia"), is the best-known work by the 16th-century Muslim writer Shihab al-Dīn Aḥmad ibn ʿAbd al-Qādir ibn Sālim ibn ʿUthmān of Adal-era Harar.

Written in Arabic, the Futuh al-Habasha is a firsthand account of the Ethiopian-Adal war in the 1500s. It details the conquests made by the Adal Sultanate in modern-day north, central and southern Ethiopia. It was written by Arab Faqih, a participant in the Adal army.

The authors' informants who contributed to the collection of information for his work included Emir Hussain b. Abu Bakr al-Gaturi and Ahmad Din b. Khalad b. Hargaya Muhammad, among others. According to linguist Giorgio Banti the Futuh al-Habasha is commonly associated with Harari literature.

== Author ==
Shihāb al-Dīn Aḥmad ibn ʿAbd al-Qādir ibn Sālim ibn ʿUthmān, known as ʿArab Faqīh ("the Arab Jurist"), was a Sufi scholar and jurist active during the Adal Sultanate era.

== Editions ==
A translation of Futūḥ al-Habasha in French was authored by René Basset (Paris, 1897).

The English edition was published by Tsehai Publishers & Distributors, translated by Paul Stenhouse and edited by Richard Pankhurst in 2003.
