= Giorgio Banti =

Italian linguist

- Born: 4 February 1949; Rome, Italy
- Education: Sapienza University of Rome
- Occupations: writer, scholar

Giorgio Banti is a scholar of African studies and Linguistics.

== Early life ==
Giorgio Banti was born in Rome, Italy. He completed his post secondary studies at Sapienza University of Rome.

== Career ==
Giorgio Banti became a professor at University of Naples "L'Orientale" in 1997, where he taught General and Historical Linguistics as well as Somali Language and Literature. He was also an educator at Somali National University.

From 2014 to 2019, Giorgio Banti served as Vice President of the University of Naples “L’Orientale.

== Recognitions and retirement ==
In 2021, he was decorated as a professor emeritus at the Ministry of Education, University and Research in Italy.

== Selected publications ==
- 1980: "I clitici antico-indiani". In Berrettoni, P., ed., Problemi dianalisi linguistica. Rome: Cadmo Editore, 9-42 p.
- 1981: "Problems of Somali lessicography", Proceedings of the Sodalizio Glottologico Milanese 21: 34-57 p.
- 1984: “The morphology of the Nominative case in Somali.” Wiener Linguistische Gazette 3: 27-31 p.
- 1988: “Two Cushitic systems: Somali and Oromo nouns.” Dordrecht: Foris Publications. 11-49 p.
- 1990. "Introduction", translation and notes of Xuseen Sh. Axmed "Kaddare", Waasuge and Warsame (A 30 day journey). Rome Bagatto Libri.
- 1991: "African immigration to Rome: some linguistic and cultural notes", La ricerca folklorica. 131-136 p.
- 1993: "introduction, translation and notes of the short story "Soo Haabo" Linea d'Ombra 47-50 p.
- 1994: “Bogumil Witalis Andrzejewski “Goosh” Review of Ethiopian Studies. 143-150 p.
- 1996: “Cabdi Muxumud Amiin: a critical voice from Somalia” Africa e Mediterraneo. 24-29 p.
- 1997: “Names of aromata in Semitic and Cushitic languages.” Rome: Bretschneider 169-192 p.
- 1999: “Meter” In A. Duranti, ed., Language matters in Anthropology: a lexicon for the new millennium, special issue of Journal of Linguistic Anthropology. Oxford: Blackwell Publishers 150-153 p.
- 2000: “Notes on Somali camel terminology” Afrikanistische Beiträge zum 65 Köln: Rüdiger Köppe Verlag. 45-62 p.
- 2001: “Historical and Linguistic Traditions of the Banaadir.” The First National Conference of the Banaadiri in Italy”, Africa and the Mediterranean 37:69b-70b. p.
- 2004: “Comparative notes on the Cushitic imperative”. Münster: Ugarit-Verlag. 55-91 p.
- 2005: “Folktales in Oromiffa” Encyclopaedia Aethiopica. Wiesbaden: Harrassowitz. 559b -560b p.
- 2007: “Trends in the diachronic development of Semitic verbal morphology”. Amsterdam & Philadelphia: John Benjamins Publishing Company. 1-23 p.
- 2008: “Lexical Italianisms in Saho”. Ethnorêma. 67-93 p.
- 2009: “Introduction” Ethnorêma. 1-10 p.
- 2010: “The literature of Harar until the end of the 19th century”. Mediterranean Civilizations. 149-181 p.
- 2011: “Saho language”. Encyclopaedia Aethiopica. Wiesbaden: Harrassowitz. 468b-471a p.
- 2013: “Strata in loanwords from Arabic and other Semitic languages in Northern Somali” Berlin: Walter De Gruyter. 185-210 p.
- 2014. "The nazme: a genre of religious poetry of the Eritrean Saho.” Linguistic Encounters. 123-34 p.
- 2015: “Some issues in Somali orthography. Habqorista af-soomaaligu si habboon ma u xasili kartaa?” Djibouti: AGA – The Intergovernmental Academy of Somali Language. 36-48 p.
- 2017: “In memoriam Didier Morin (1947–2016) )”. Aethiopica
- 2018: Review article of M. TOSCO, ed. Afroasiatic - Data and perspectives. Amsterdam & Philadelphia: John Benjamins). Ethnorêma. 129-34 p.
- 2019: “The footprints of the Companions - A Somali short travelogue by Jama Musse Jama, with translation and comments by Giorgio Banti”. Ethnorêma. 149-57 p.
- 2020: “Some further remarks on the Old Harari Kitāb alfarāyiḍ”. ISMEO. 255-84 p.
- 2021: “Nara phonology”. Rassegna di Studi Etiopici. 235-68 p.
- 2022: “Introduzione”. In: Vergari M., ed., Housing and dwelling among the Saho-speaking communities of Eritrea and Ethiopia. History, anthropology and lexicography, Trieste: EUT. 7-50 p.
- 2023: “Oromo”. The Oxford handbook of Ethiopian languages. Oxford &c.: Oxford University Press. 257-93 p.
- 2024: “Sentential complements and predicates in Northern Somali” Brill's Journal of Afroasiatic Languages and Linguistics. 137-170 p.
