= Shihab al-Dīn Aḥmad ibn ʿAbd al-Qādir ibn Sālim ibn ʿUthmān =

Arab writer (16th century)

- Title: Arab Faqih

Personal life
- Era: Adal Sultanate
- Region: Horn of Africa
- Main interest: Warfare
- Notable work: Futūh al-Habasha

Religious life
- Religion: Islam
- Jurisprudence: Sunni

Shihab al-Dīn Aḥmad ibn ʿAbd al-Qādir ibn Sālim ibn ʿUthmān, most commonly known as Arab Faqīh, was a Yemeni writer from the port of Jizan. Best known for writing the chronicle "Futuh al-Habasha", a first hand account of the Ethiopian-Adal war in the 16th century.

== Biography ==
Arab Faqih was a citizen of the Adal Sultanate and a religious Sufi. He is believed to be of Yemeni descent according to most modern scholars. Arab Faqih was a companion of Šams ad-Din ‘Ali bin 'Umar aš-Šādili al-Qarši al-Yemeni who according to French linguist René Basset established coffee drinking into Arabia.

His surname in the Harari language was 'Arab Faqih,' which translates to "the Arab Jurist," a name suggesting Arab Yemeni roots. Enrico Cerulli described him as probably a Harari, while noting that the title ‘Arab Faqih’ could point to Yemeni origins.

He used to document his work (which were left unfinished) in Jizan, Yemen.

Linguist Giorgio Banti states it is noteworthy that his name Arab Faqīh is constructed using Arabic vocabulary while adhering to Harari grammatical rules.

Arab Faqih is notable for writing the "Futuh al-Habasha" which details the sixteenth century war between Adal and Abyssinia from the point of view of Harar residents.
