= Harari language =

Semitic language of eastern Ethiopia

Harari
- ጌይ ሲናን (gēy sinan)
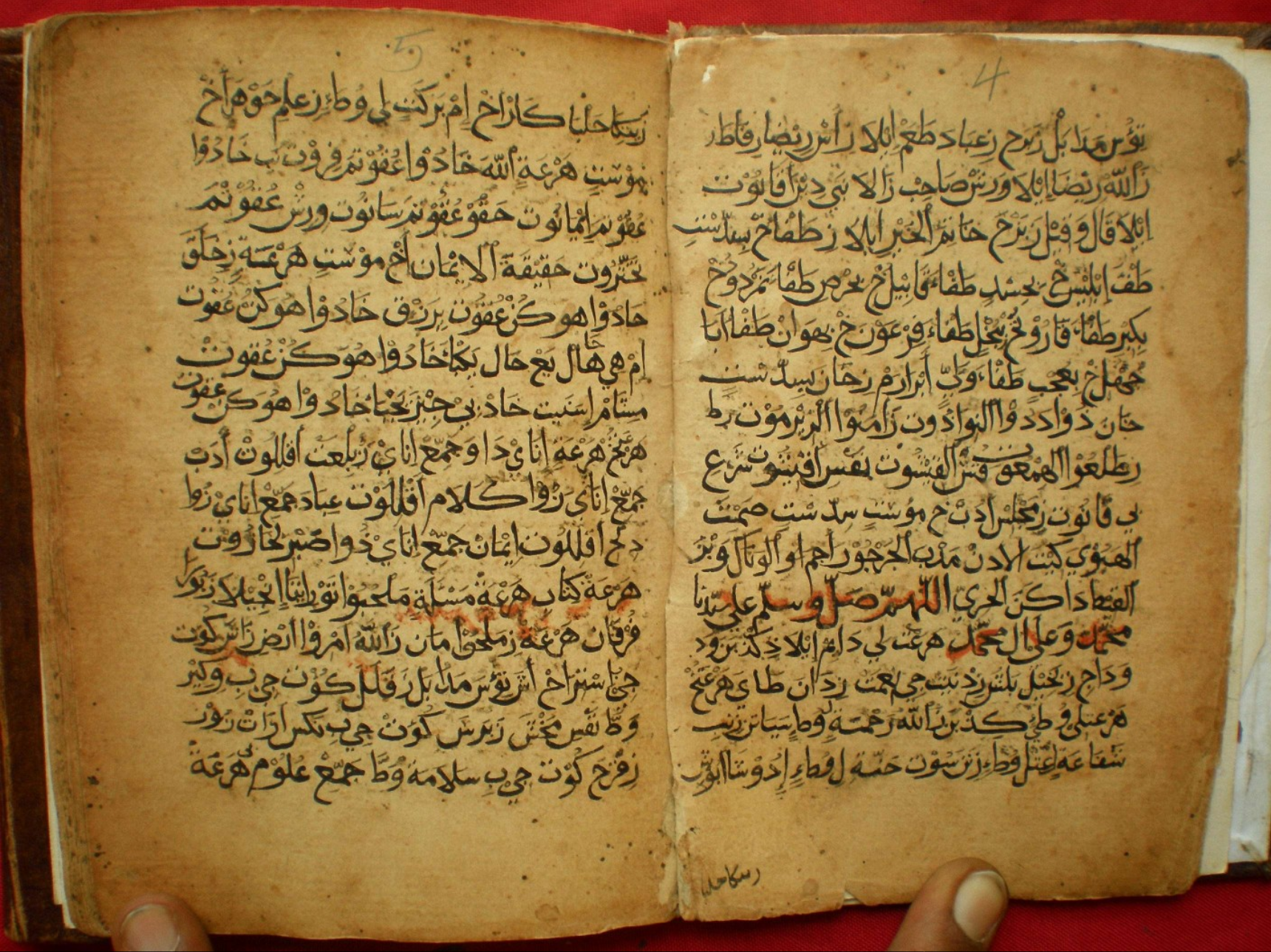
- 18th century manuscript in the Harari language; titled Kitāb Al Farā'id
- Native to: Ethiopia
- Region: Harari Region
- Ethnicity: Harari
- Speakers: L1: 27,000 (2007 census); L2: 8,300
- Language family: Afro-Asiatic: Semitic; West Semitic; South Semitic; Ethiopic; South; Transversal; Harari–East Gurage; Harari
- Early forms: Old Harari: Middle Harari
- Writing system: Ge'ez script (officially); Arabic script (formerly); Latin script (informally; diaspora); Harari script

Language codes
- ISO 639-3: har
- Glottolog: hara1271

Harari (endonym: ጌይ ሲናን Harari pronunciation: [geː.sɨ.ˈnaːn]) is an Ethio-Semitic language spoken by the Harari people of Ethiopia. Old Harari is a literary language of the city of Harar, a central hub of Islam in the Horn of Africa. According to the 2007 Ethiopian census, it is spoken by 25,810 people. Harari is closely related to the Eastern Gurage languages, Zay, and Siltʼe, all of whom are believed to be linked to the now extinct Semitic Harla language. Locals or natives of Harar refer to their language as Gēy Sinan 'language of the City' (Gēy is the word for how Harari speakers refer to the city of Harar, whose name is an exonym). According to Wolf Leslau, Sidama is the substratum language of Harari and influenced the vocabulary greatly. He identified unique Cushitic loanwords found only in Harari and deduced that it may have Cushitic roots.

Harari was originally written with a version of the Arabic script, Harari script, then the Ethiopic script was adopted to write the language. Some Harari speakers in diaspora write their language with the Latin alphabet.

== Phonology ==
=== Consonants ===
Harari consonants
		Labial	Dental	Alveolar		Post-alv./ Palatal	Velar	Uvular	Pharyngeal	Glottal
		Labial	Dental	plain	emphatic	Post-alv./ Palatal	Velar	Uvular	Pharyngeal	Glottal
Nasal		m		n		ɲ				
Stop	voiceless	p		t		tʃ	k	q		ʔ
Stop	voiced	b		d	dˤ	dʒ	ɡ			
Stop	ejective			t’		tʃ’	k’			
Fricative	voiceless	f	θ	s	sˤ	ʃ	x		ħ	h
Fricative	voiced	v	ð	z	zˁ	ʒ	ɣ		ʕ	
Trill				r						
Approximant				l		j	w			

=== Vowels ===
Harari vowels
	Front		Central	Back	
	short	long	Central	short	long
Close	ɪ	iː	ɨ	ʊ	uː
Mid	e	eː		o	oː
Open	æ		aː		

== Grammar ==
=== Nouns ===
==== Number ====
Wolf Leslau discusses Harari–East Gurage phonology and grammar: The noun has two numbers, singular and plural. The affix -ač changes singulars into plurals:

abōč 'a man'; abōčač 'men'
wandaq 'a servant'; wandaqač 'servants'
gar 'a house'; garač 'houses'

Nouns ending in a or i become plural without reduplicating this letter:

gafa 'a slave'; gafač 'slaves'
gumna 'a harlot'; gumnač 'harlots'
liği 'a son'; liğiyač 'sons'
qabri 'a grave'; qabriyač 'graves'

/s/ alternates with /z/:

färäz 'a horse'; färäzač 'horses'
iraaz 'toga'; iraazač 'togas'

==== Gender ====
Masculine nouns may be converted into feminines by three processes. The first changes the terminal vowel into -it, or adds -it to the terminal consonant:

rágá 'an old man'; rágít 'an old woman'
buchí 'male dog'; buchít 'female dog'
wasíf 'a slave boy'; wasífít 'a slave girl'

Animals of different sexes have different names. and this forms the second process:

bárá 'an ox'; lám 'a cow'

The third and the most common way of expressing sex is by means of korma 'male or man' and inistí 'woman, female', corresponding to English "he-" and "she-":

korma faraz 'a stallion'; inistí faraz 'a mare'
korma baqal 'a he-mule'; inistí basal 'a she-mule'

=== Pronouns ===
English	Independent	Object pronoun suffixes			Possessive suffixes
English	Independent	Direct	Prepositional		Possessive suffixes
English	Independent	Direct	Benefactive	Locative/adversative	Possessive suffixes
I	ኣን an				
you (m. sg.)	አኻኽ äkhakh				
you (f. sg.)	አኻሽ akhâsh				
you (polite/formal)	አኻኹ akhâkhu				
he/him	አዝዞ äzzo				
she/her	አዝዜ äzze				
s/he (polite/formal)	አዝዚዩ äzziyu				
we	ኢኛች ignâch				
you (pl.)	አኻኻች akhâkhâch				
they	አዝዚያች äzziyach				

Harari demonstrative pronouns
Number, Gender		Near	Far
Singular	Masculine	ዪ yi (i)	የእ yäǝ
Singular	Feminine	ኢትተ ittä	የትተ yättä
Plural		ዪያች yiyâch	የኣች Ya’âch

Person	Singular	Plural
1	Án	Innách or Inyách.
2	Akhákh	Akhákhách
3	Azo	(383) Azziyách

The affixed pronouns or possessives attached to nouns are:

Singular.

1st Pers. – e, my or mine. : Gár-e, my house.
2nd Pers. – khá, thy or thine. Gár-khá, thy house.
3rd Pers. – zo, or – so, his. Gár-zo, his house.

Plural.

1st Pers. – zinya or sinya, our. : Gár-zinya, our house.
2nd Pers. – kho, your. Gár-kho, your house.
3rd Pers. – ziyu or siyu, their. Gár-ziyu, their house. (384)

In the same way attached pronouns are affixed to verbs:

Sit-ayn: give (thou to) me.
Sit-ana: give (thou to) us.

The demonstrative pronouns are:

Sing. Yí, this.
Yá', that.
Plur. Yíách, these.
Yá'ách, those.

The interrogative pronouns are the following:

Mántá: who?
Mintá: what?

Án atti'e hárkho: I myself went.
Akhákh attikha hárkhí: thou thyself wentest.
Azo attiizo hára: he himself went.

=== Verbs ===
The following are the two auxiliary verbs:

'to be'
			Past		Present		Imperative
			Affirmative	Negative	Affirmative	Negative	Imperative
Person	(s)	1	Án narkhú.	Án alnárkhúm.	Án halkho.	Án elkhúm.	
Person	(s)	2	Akhákh nárkhí.	Akhákh alnárkhím.	Akhákh halkhí.	Akhákh elkhím.	Hal.
Person	(s)	3	Azo nárá.	Azo alnárám.	Azo hal (<A>).	Azo elúm.	
Person	(pl)	1	Inyách nárná.	Inyách alnárnám.	Inyách halna.	Inyách elnám.	
Person	(pl)	2	Akhákhách narkhú.	Akhákhách alnárkhúm.	Akhákhách halkhú.	Akhákhách elkhúm.	Halkhú.
Person	(pl)	3	Aziyách nárú.	Aziyách alnárúm.	Aziyách halú	Aziyásc elúm.	

Past tense

Sing. 1. I became: Án ikaní náarkho.
2. Thou becamest: Akhákh tikání nárkhí.
3. He became: Azo ikáni nárá.
Plur. 1. We became: Innách nikání nárná.
2. Ye became: Akhákhách tikání nárkhú.
3. They became: Aziyách ikání nárú.

Present tense

Sing. 1. I become: Án ikánákh.
2. Thou becomest: Akhákh tikánákh.
3. He becomes: Azo ikánál.
Plur. 1. We become: Inyách nikánáná.
2. Ye become: Akhákhách tikánákhu.
3. They become: Aziyách yikánálú.

Imperative

Become thou, "Kanni". Become ye, "Kánnú".

Prohibitive

Sing. 2. Become not, ikánnumekh.
Plur. 2. Become not ye, tikánnumekhu.

Past tense

(Affirmative form)

Sing. 1. I went, Án letkho.
2. Thous wentest, Akhákh letkhí.
3. He went, Azo leta.
Plur. 1. We went, Inyách letna.
2. Ye went, Akhákhách letkhú.
3. They went, Aziyách letú.

(Negative form)

Sing. 1. I went not, Án alletkhúm.
2. Thou wentest not, Akbákh alletkhím.
3. He went not, Azo alletám.
Plur. 1. We went not, Inyách aletnám.
2. Ye went not, Akhákách alletkhúm.
3. They went not, Azziyách alletúm.

Present tense.

(Affirmative form)

1. I go, Án iletákh 1. Inyásh niletáná.
2. Thou goest, Akhákh tiletínakh 2. Akhákhách tiletákhú.
3. He goes, Azo yiletál 3. Azziyách yiletálú.

(Negative form)

Sing. 1. I go not, Án iletumekh.
2. Thou goest not, Akhákh tiletumekh.
3. He goes not, Azo yiletumel.
Plur. 1. We go not, Inyách niletumena.
2. Ye go not, Akhákhach tiletumekhú.
3. They go not, Azziyách iletuelú.

Sing. 1. I will go, Án iletle halkho.
2. Thou wilt go, Akháhk tiletle halkhí.
3. He will go, Azo iletle hal.
Plur. 1. We will go, Inyách niletle halns.
2. Ye will go, Akhákhách tiletle halkhú.
3. They will go, Azziyách niletle halns.

== Writing system ==
Harari today is generally written in three scripts. It was originally written in an unmodified and now in a standardized modified Arabic Script. The Ethiopic script was then adopted to write Harari in the 1990s. There is a Latin version of the script used by the Harari diaspora.

Historically the language was also written in native Harari secret script until the late 70s. French trader Alfred Barday stated in the mid 19th century that the traditional Harari script had ceased to be utilized.

=== Harari Arabic script ===
Harari Arabic script consists of 36 letters, made up of the original 28 Arabic letters, plus 8 additional letters for sounds unique to Harari or to loanwords of European origin. 8 of the original 28 letters are only used for writing of loanwords of Arabic origin (shown in beige in the table below). 2 of the 8 new letters are only used for writing of loanwords of European origin (shown in green in the table below).

Harari Arabic script is also made up of 5 vowel diacritics. A unique and noteworthy feature of this script is that it indicates stressed syllables in an explicit manner, as explained in the following section.

Harari Arabic script
Isolated	Final	Medial	Initial	IPA	Romanization	Ge'ez Equivalent
أ / إ	ـا		ا	[∅ / ʔ]	a / '	አ
ب	ـب	ـبـ	بـ	[b]	b	በ
پ	ـپ	ـپـ	پـ	[p]	p	ፐ
ت	ـت	ـتـ	تـ	[t]	t	ተ
ث	ـث	ـثـ	ثـ	[θ]	ṫ	ሠ
ج	ـج	ـجـ	جـ	[dʒ]	j	ጀ
ݘ	ـݘ	ـݘـ	ݘـ	[g]	g	ገ
ح	ـح	ـحـ	حـ	[ħ]	ḣ	ሐ
خ	ـخ	ـخـ	خـ	[x]	kh	ኸ
د	ـد		د	[d]	d	ደ
ذ	ـذ		ذ	[ð]	dh	ፀ
ر	ـر		ر	[r]	r	ረ
ز	ـز		ز	[z]	z	ዘ
ژ	ـژ		ژ	[ʒ]	zh	ዠ
س	ـس	ـسـ	سـ	[s]	s	ሰ
ش	ـش	ـشـ	شـ	[ʃ]	sh	ሸ
ڛ	ـڛ	ـڛـ	ڛـ	[tʃ]	ch	ቸ
ص	ـص	ـصـ	صـ	[sˁ]	ṡ	ጸ
ض	ـض	ـضـ	ضـ	[dˁ]	ḋ	ጰ
ط	ـط	ـطـ	طـ	[t’]	x	ጠ
ظ	ـظ	ـظـ	ظـ	[zˁ]	ż	ⶰ
ڟ	ـڟ	ـڟـ	ڟـ	[tʃ’]	c	ጨ
ع	ـع	ـعـ	عـ	[ʕ]	ȧ	ዐ
غ	ـغ	ـغـ	غـ	[ɣ]	gh	ኀ
ف	ـف	ـفـ	فـ	[f]	f	ፈ
ڤ	ـڤ	ـڤـ	ڤـ	[v]	v	ቨ
ق	ـق	ـقـ	قـ	[q]	q	ቀ
ك	ـك	ـكـ	كـ	[k]	k	ከ
ڬ	ـڬ	ـڬـ	ڬـ	[k’]	xh	ዸ
ل	ـل	ـلـ	لـ	[l]	l	ለ
م	ـم	ـمـ	مـ	[m]	m	መ
ن	ـن	ـنـ	نـ	[n]	n	ነ
ڹ	ـڹ	ـڹـ	ڹـ	[ɲ]	gn	ኘ
ه	ـه	ـهـ	هـ	[h]	h	ሀ
و	ـو		و	[w]	w	ወ
ي	ـي	ـيـ	يـ	[j]	y	የ

==== Vowel markings table ====
In Harari Arabic script, there are 5 vowels (a, e, i, o, u). These vowels are shown with the three Arabic diacritics (a, i, u), plus two additional diacritics (e, o). Furthermore, in Harari Arabic script, vowels are also distinguished by length, indicated by mater lectionis letters, and by stress, indicated by a combination of hamza and mater lectionis letters.

Vowels
Independent
	short vowel	long vowel	Short stressed vowel	long stressed vowel
a	أَ ‌( a ) [æ]	ءَا ‌( â ) [aː]	ءَأْ ‌( aʼ ) [ˈæ]	ءَاءْ ‌( âʼ ) [ˈaː]
e	إٛ ‌( e ) [e]	إٛىـ / إٛى ‌( ê ) [eː]	ءٛئْـ / ءٛئْ ‌( eʼ ) [ˈe]	إٛىءْ ‌( êʼ ) [ˈeː]
i	إِ ‌( i ) [ɪ]	إِىـ / إِى ‌( î ) [iː]	ءِئْـ / ءِئْ ‌( iʼ ) [ˈɪ]	إِىءْ ‌( îʼ ) [ˈiː]
o	أٚ ‌( o ) [o]	أٚو ‌( ô ) [oː]	ءٚؤْ ‌( oʼ ) [ˈo]	أٚوءْ ‌( ôʼ ) [ˈoː]
u	أُ ‌( u ) [ʊ]	أُو ‌( û ) [uː]	ءُؤْ ‌( uʼ ) [ˈʊ]	أُوءْ ‌( ûʼ ) [ˈuː]
Dependent (Template)
-a	◌َ ‌( -a ) [æ]	◌َـا ‌( -â ) [aː]	◌َـأْ ‌( -aʼ ) [ˈæ]	◌َـاءْ ‌( -âʼ ) [ˈaː]
-e	◌ٛ ‌( -e ) [e]	◌ٛىـ / ◌ٛـى ‌( -ê ) [eː]	◌ٛـئْـ / ◌ٛـئْ ‌( -eʼ ) [ˈe]	◌ٛـىءْ ‌( -êʼ ) [ˈeː]
-i	◌ِ ‌( -i ) [ɪ]	◌ِـىـ / ◌ِـى ‌( -î ) [iː]	◌ِـئْـ / ◌ِـئْ ‌( -iʼ ) [ˈɪ]	◌ِـىءْ ‌( -îʼ ) [ˈiː]
-o	◌ٚ ‌( -o ) [o]	◌ٚـو ‌( -ô ) [oː]	◌ٚـؤْ ‌( -oʼ ) [ˈo]	◌ٚـوءْ ‌( -ôʼ ) [ˈoː]
-u	◌ُ ‌( -u ) [ʊ]	◌ُـو ‌( -û ) [uː]	◌ُـؤْ ‌( -uʼ ) [ˈʊ]	◌ُـوءْ ‌( -ûʼ ) [ˈuː]
Dependent (for letter ب b as sample)
ba	بَـ / بَ ‌( ba ) [bæ]	بَا ‌( bâ ) [baː]	بَأْ ‌( baʼ ) [ˈbæ]	بَاءْ ‌( bâʼ ) [ˈbaː]
be	بٛـ / بٛ ‌( be ) [be]	بٛىـ / بٛى ‌( bê ) [beː]	بٛئْـ / بٛئْ ‌( beʼ ) [ˈbe]	بٛىءْ ‌( bêʼ ) [ˈbeː]
bi	بِـ / بِ ‌( bi ) [bɪ]	بِىـ / بِى ‌( bî ) [biː]	بِئْـ / بِئْ ‌( biʼ ) [ˈbɪ]	بِىءْ ‌( bîʼ ) [ˈbiː]
bo	بٚـ / بٚ ‌( bo ) [bo]	بٚو ‌( bô ) [boː]	بٚؤْ ‌( boʼ ) [ˈbo]	بٚوءْ ‌( bôʼ ) [ˈboː]
bu	بُـ‌ / بُ ‌( bu ) [bʊ]	بُو ‌( bû ) [buː]	بُؤْ ‌( buʼ ) [ˈbʊ]	بُوءْ ‌( bûʼ ) [ˈbuː]
Dependent (for a geminated letter بّ bb as sample)
bba	بَّـ / بَّ ‌( bba ) [bbæ]	بَّا ‌( bbâ ) [bbaː]	بَّأْ ‌( bbaʼ ) [ˈbbæ]	بَّاءْ ‌( bbâʼ ) [ˈbbaː]
bbe	بّٛـ / بّٛ ‌( bbe ) [be]	بّٛىـ / بّٛى ‌( bbê ) [beː]	بّٛئْـ / بّٛئْ ‌( bbeʼ ) [ˈbe]	بّٛىءْ ‌( bbêʼ ) [ˈbeː]
bbi	بِّـ / بِّ ‌( bbi ) [bbɪ]	بِّىـ / بِّى ‌( bbî ) [bbiː]	بِّئْـ / بِّئْ ‌( bbiʼ ) [ˈbbɪ]	بِّىءْ ‌( bbîʼ ) [ˈbbiː]
bbo	بّٚـ / بّٚ ‌( bbo ) [bbo]	بّٚو ‌( bbô ) [bboː]	بّٚؤْ ‌( bboʼ ) [ˈbbo]	بّٚوءْ ‌( bbôʼ ) [ˈbboː]
bbu	بُّـ‌ / بُّ ‌( bbu ) [bbʊ]	بُّو ‌( bbû ) [bbuː]	بُّؤْ ‌( bbuʼ ) [ˈbbʊ]	بُّوءْ ‌( bbûʼ ) [ˈbbuː]
Zero-vowel Sign
-	◌ْ ‌( - ) [-]	بْـ / بْ ‌( b- ) [b]		

=== Modified Ge'ez script ===
Harari can be written in the unmodified Ethiopic script as most vowel differences can be disambiguated from context. The Harari adaptation of the Ethiopic script adds a long vowel version of the Ethiopic/Amharic vowels by adding a dot on top of the letter. In addition certain consonants are pronounced differently when compared to the Amharic pronunciation.

The table below shows the Harari alphasyllabary with the Romanized, Arabic equivalence, and IPA representation along the rows and the Romanized vowel markings along the columns.

Harari writing system
Romanization	Arabic Equivalent	IPA	a [æ]	â [aː]	u [ʊ]	û [uː]	i [ɪ]	î [iː]	e [e]	ê [eː]	o [o]	ô [oː]	∅/ə [∅/ɨ]
h	ه	h	ሀ	ሃ	ሁ	ሁ፞	ሂ	ሂ፞	ሄ	ሄ፞	ሆ	ሆ፞	ህ
l	ل	l	ለ	ላ	ሉ	ሉ፞	ሊ	ሊ፞	ሌ	ሌ፞	ሎ	ሎ፞	ል
ḣ	ح	ħ	ሐ	ሓ	ሑ	ሑ፞	ሒ	ሒ፞	ሔ	ሔ፞	ሖ	ሖ፞	ሕ
m	م	m	መ	ማ	ሙ	ሙ፞	ሚ	ሚ፞	ሜ	ሜ፞	ሞ	ሞ፞	ም
ṫ	ث	θ	ሠ	ሣ	ሡ	ሡ፞	ሢ	ሢ፞	ሤ	ሤ፞	ሦ	ሦ፞	ሥ
r	ر	r	ረ	ራ	ሩ	ሩ፞	ሪ	ሪ፞	ሬ	ሬ፞	ሮ	ሮ፞	ር
s	س	s	ሰ	ሳ	ሱ	ሱ፞	ሲ	ሲ፞	ሴ	ሴ፞	ሶ	ሶ፞	ስ
sh	ش	ʃ	ሸ	ሻ	ሹ	ሹ፞	ሺ	ሺ፞	ሼ	ሼ፞	ሾ	ሾ፞	ሽ
q	ق	q	ቀ	ቃ	ቁ	ቁ፞	ቂ	ቂ፞	ቄ	ቄ፞	ቆ	ቆ፞	ቅ
b	ب	b	በ	ባ	ቡ	ቡ፞	ቢ	ቢ፞	ቤ	ቤ፞	ቦ	ቦ፞	ብ
v	ڤ	v	ቨ	ቫ	ቩ	ቩ፞	ቪ	ቪ፞	ቬ	ቬ፞	ቮ	ቮ፞	ቭ
t	ت	t	ተ	ታ	ቱ	ቱ፞	ቲ	ቲ፞	ቴ	ቴ፞	ቶ	ቶ፞	ት
ch	ڛ	tʃ	ቸ	ቻ	ቹ	ቹ፞	ቺ	ቺ፞	ቼ	ቼ፞	ቾ	ቾ፞	ች
gh	غ	ɣ	ኀ	ኃ	ኁ	ኁ፞	ኂ	ኂ፞	ኄ	ኄ፞	ኆ	ኆ፞	ኅ
n	ن	n	ነ	ና	ኑ	ኑ፞	ኒ	ኒ፞	ኔ	ኔ፞	ኖ	ኖ፞	ን
gn	ڹ	ɲ	ኘ	ኛ	ኙ	ኙ፞	ኚ	ኚ፞	ኜ	ኜ፞	ኞ	ኞ፞	ኝ
'/a	أ / إ	∅ / ʔ	አ	ኣ	ኡ	ኡ፞	ኢ	ኢ፞	ኤ	ኤ፞	ኦ	ኦ፞	እ
k	ك	k	ከ	ካ	ኩ	ኩ፞	ኪ	ኪ፞	ኬ	ኬ፞	ኮ	ኮ፞	ክ
kh	خ	x	ኸ	ኻ	ኹ	ኹ፞	ኺ	ኺ፞	ኼ	ኼ፞	ኾ	ኾ፞	ኽ
w	و	w	ወ	ዋ	ዉ	ዉ፞	ዊ	ዊ፞	ዌ	ዌ፞	ዎ	ዎ፞	ው
ȧ	ع	ʕ	ዐ	ዓ	ዑ	ዑ፞	ዒ	ዒ፞	ዔ	ዔ፞	ዖ	ዖ፞	ዕ
z	ز	z	ዘ	ዛ	ዙ	ዙ፞	ዚ	ዚ፞	ዜ	ዜ፞	ዞ	ዞ፞	ዝ
zh	ژ	ʒ	ዠ	ዣ	ዡ	ዡ፞	ዢ	ዢ፞	ዤ	ዤ፞	ዦ	ዦ፞	ዥ
y	ي	j	የ	ያ	ዩ	ዩ፞	ዪ	ዪ፞	ዬ	ዬ፞	ዮ	ዮ፞	ይ
d	د	d	ደ	ዳ	ዱ	ዱ፞	ዲ	ዲ፞	ዴ	ዴ፞	ዶ	ዶ፞	ድ
xh	ڬ	k’	ዸ	ዻ	ዹ	ዹ፞	ዺ	ዺ፞	ዼ	ዼ፞	ዾ	ዾ፞	ዽ
j	ج	dʒ	ጀ	ጃ	ጁ	ጁ፞	ጂ	ጂ፞	ጄ	ጄ፞	ጆ	ጆ፞	ጅ
g	ݘ	g	ገ	ጋ	ጉ	ጉ፞	ጊ	ጊ፞	ጌ	ጌ፞	ጎ	ጎ፞	ግ
x	ط	t’	ጠ	ጣ	ጡ	ጡ፞	ጢ	ጢ፞	ጤ	ጤ፞	ጦ	ጦ፞	ጥ
c	ڟ	tʃ’	ጨ	ጫ	ጩ	ጩ፞	ጪ	ጪ፞	ጬ	ጬ፞	ጮ	ጮ፞	ጭ
ḋ	ض	dˁ	ጰ	ጳ	ጱ	ጱ፞	ጲ	ጲ፞	ጴ	ጴ፞	ጶ	ጶ፞	ጵ
ṡ	ص	sˁ	ጸ	ጻ	ጹ	ጹ፞	ጺ	ጺ፞	ጼ	ጼ፞	ጾ	ጾ፞	ጽ
dh	ذ	ð	ፀ	ፃ	ፁ	ፁ፞	ፂ	ፂ፞	ፄ	ፄ፞	ፆ	ፆ፞	ፅ
f	ف	f	ፈ	ፋ	ፉ	ፉ፞	ፊ	ፊ፞	ፌ	ፌ፞	ፎ	ፎ፞	ፍ
p	پ	p	ፐ	ፓ	ፑ	ፑ፞	ፒ	ፒ፞	ፔ	ፔ፞	ፖ	ፖ፞	ፕ
ż	ظ	zˁ	ⶰ	ⶳ	ⶱ	ⶱ፞	ⶲ	ⶲ፞	ⶴ	ⶴ፞	ⶶ	ⶶ፞	ⶵ
Romanization	Arabic Equivalent	IPA	a [æ]	â [aː]	u [ʊ]	û [uː]	i [ɪ]	î [iː]	e [e]	ê [eː]	o [o]	ô [oː]	∅/ə [∅/ɨ]

Notes

- Gemination can be done by simply writing the "∅/ə" variation of a letter before the letter itself.
- Stressed vowels can be written by following a letter with እ (The "no-vowel" variation of the "a" letter)
  - For example, the Harari demonstrative pronoun yaʼ (يَأْ) is written as የእ
- Formerly, long-e (ê) and long-i (î) were represented by adding እ (y) after the character. Now, a dot diacritic is preferred instead.
- Formerly, Long-o (ô) and long-u (û) were represented by adding ው (w) after the character Now, a dot diacritic is preferred instead.

=== Modified Latin script ===
Teble below shows the Latin script, modified and adapted for Harari language.

Upper case letter	Lower case letter	IPA	Arabic Equivalent	Ge'ez equivalent
A	a	[æ]	أَ / ◌َ	አ
Â	â	[aː]	ءَا / ◌َـا	ኣ
Ȧ	ȧ	[ʕ]	ع	ዐ
B	b	[b]	ب	በ
C	c	[tʃ’]	ڟ	ጨ
Ch	ch	[tʃ]	ڛ	ቸ
D	d	[d]	د	ደ
Dh	dh	[ð]	ذ	ፀ
Ḋ	ḋ	[dˁ]	ض	ጰ
E	e	[e]	إٛ ‌/ ◌ٛ	ኤ
Ê	ê	[eː]	إٛى / ◌ٛـى	ኤ፞
F	f	[f]	ف	ፈ
G	g	[g]	ݘ	ገ
Gh	gh	[ɣ]	غ	ኀ
Gn	gn	[ɲ]	ڹ	ኘ
H	h	[h]	ه	ሀ
Ḣ	ḣ	[ħ]	ح	ሐ
I	i	[ɪ]	إِ / ◌ِ	ኢ
Î	î	[iː]	إِى / ◌ِـى	ኢ፞
J	j	[dʒ]	ج	ጀ
K	k	[k]	ك	ከ
Kh	kh	[x]	خ	ኸ
L	l	[l]	ل	ለ
M	m	[m]	م	መ
N	n	[n]	ن	ነ
O	o	[o]	أٚ / ◌ٚ	ኦ
Ô	ô	[oː]	أٚو / ◌ٚـو	ኦ፞
P	p	[p]	پ	ፐ
Q	q	[q]	ق	ቀ
R	r	[r]	ر	ረ
S	s	[s]	س	ሰ
Sh	sh	[ʃ]	ش	ሸ
Ṡ	ṡ	[sˁ]	ص	ጸ
T	t	[t]	ت	ተ
Ṫ	ṫ	[θ]	ث	ሠ
U	u	[ʊ]	أُ / ◌ُ	ኦ
Û	û	[uː]	أُو / ◌ُـو	ኦ፞
V	v	[v]	ڤ	ቨ
W	w	[w]	و	ወ
X	x	[t’]	ط	ጠ
Xh	xh	[k’]	ڬ	ዸ
Y	y	[j]	ي	የ
Z	z	[z]	ز	ዘ
Zh	zh	[ʒ]	ژ	ዠ
Ż	ż	[zˁ]	ظ	ⶰ
ʼ		ء	እ	

Notes

- The Harari Latin Alphabet has eight digraphs: ch, dh, gh, gn, kh, sh, xh, and zh. It is possible to have a geminated (double) consonant. In the case of digraphs, only the initial letter is doubled, i.e. “dh” followed by “dh” is written as “ddh” ፅፅ / ذّ)
- The apostrophe character has multiple functions in Harari Latin orthography:
  1. It indicates that the preceding consonant is an isolated consonant and not part of a digraph, e.g. hêgʼna (ሔ́ግነ / حٛىݘْنَ - replace), i.e. gʼn is “g+n” rather than “gn”.
  2. It distinguishes between a geminated digraph and a consonant followed by digraph, magʼgna (መግኘ / مَݘْڹَ - throwing) i.e. gʼgn is “g+gn” rather than “ggn”.
  3. It separates a consonant and a following independent vowel, Gaz’i (ገዝኢ / چَزْإِ - God)
  4. If following a vowel, it indicates that the vowel is stressed, raʼyi (ረእዪ / رَأْيِ - idea) or usuʼ (ኡሱእ / أُسُؤْ - person).

=== Sample Text ===
Below is a sample text, in the three scripts for Harari.

Latin Script	Waldâchzinâw dînziyu wâ sinânzîw matlêmadle 1992be qurân gêy kafatnama gêy sinânuw amânbe matlêmad nifarkikut lâtin harfîbe matlêmad êgalna. Yîbe amânbe waldâchzina ûga zilahadube, 1999be bâdbe (ḣararbe) hukûmazina sabi harfibe sinânzinâw maktable murti huluf zâshasa igʼgnâchum fîtzanâw azzo garab gargab âshna. Yakhnimâm qâcibe zilêqu waldâchuw sabi harfîw matlêmad ôrkut tâb khânama agagnnêw.
Ge'ez Script	ወልዳችዚናው ዲ፞ንዚዩ ዋ ሲናንዚዩ፞ው መትሌ፞መድሌ 1992ቤ ቁራን ጌ፞ይ ከፈትነመ ጌ፞ይ ሲናኑው አማንቤ መትሌ፞መድ ኒፈርኪኩት ላቲ́ን ሐርፊ፞ቤ መትሌ፞መድ ኤ፞ገልነ፨ ዪ፞ቤ አማንቤ ወልዳችዚነ ኡ፞ገ ዚለሐዱቤ፣ 1999ቤ ባድቤ (ሀረርቤ) ሑኩ፞መዚነ ሰቢ ሐርፊቤ ሲናንዚናው መክተብሌ ሙርቲ ሑሉፍ ዛሸሰ ኢግኛቹም ፊ፞ትዚናው አዝዞ ገረብ ገርገብ ኣሽነ። የኽኒማም ቃጪቤ ዚሌ፞ቁ ወልዳቹው ሰቢ ሐርፊ፞ው መትሌ፞መድ ኦ፞ርኩት ታብ ኻነመ አገኝኔ፞ው፨
Arabic Script	ولدڛزنو دينزي وا سننزيوو متلٚيمدلٚ 1992بٚ قرن ݘٚيي كفتنم ݘٚيي سننو اَمَانبٚ متلٚيمد نفرككت لتين هرفيبٚ متلٚيمد اٚيݘلن. ييبٚ اَمَانبٚ ولدڛزن اُوݘ زلهدبٚ, 1999بٚ بدبٚ (هرربٚ) هكومزن سب هرفبٚ سننزنو مكتبلٚ مرت هلف زشس اِݘڹڛم فيتزنو اَززٛ ݘرب ݘرݘب آشن. يخنمم قڟبٚ زلٚيق ولدڛو سب هرفيو متلٚيمد اٛوركت تب خنم اِݘڹنٚيو.
Translation	Back in 1992 Harari Language School was established to teach our children the Harari language. To simplify the process of teaching we adopted the Latin script and have successfully developed it for the need of the Harari language. In 1999, when the Harari Regional Government adopted the Sabean (Ethiopic) script, we tried to use it here for our students. However our students found Sabean script very hard to learn.

== Numerals ==
- 1. Ahad
- 2. Ko'ot
- 3. Shi'ishti
- 4. Haret
- 5. Ham'misti
- 6. Siddisti
- 7. Sa'ati
- 8. Su'ut
- 9. Zahtegn
- 10. Assir
- 11. Asra ahad
- 12. Asra ko'ot
- 13. Asra shi'ishti
- 14. Asra haret
- 15. Asra ham'misti
- 16. Asra siddisti
- 17. Asra sa'ati
- 18. Asra su'ut
- 19. Asra zahtegn
- 20. Kuya
- 30. Saasa
- 40. Arbîn
- 50. Hamsein
- 60. Sit'tin
- 70. Sa'ati asir
- 80. Su'ut asir
- 90. Zahtana
- 100. Baqla
- 1,000. Kum or Alfi
