= Amda Seyon I's expansions =

1314–1344 territorial expansion during Ethiopian Emperor Amda Seyon I

Amda Seyon I's Expansions (1314–1344) were territorial expansions during the reign of Ethiopian Emperor Amda Seyon I. Motivated by religious, commercial, and territorial factors, Amda Seyon's first conquests were Gojjam and Hadiya in 1316, and the forced seizure of the Enderta Province, where there was resistance. The most important source for the military actions undertaken during his reign is G.W.B. Huntingford's translation of his Ge'ez chronicle, The Glorious Victories. This has also come to be the name for his conquests in modern times.

== Motives ==
Amda Seyon's expansions are considered by multiple scholars to religious, commercial, and territorial, with the territorial expansionism classified as colonization. The emperor also annexed Muslim kingdoms, although his empire collected tribute from more or less autonomous regions instead of imposing direct control. There were reports of both monks and non-Christians being ambushed and killed by military groups during the wars of that period.

== Course ==
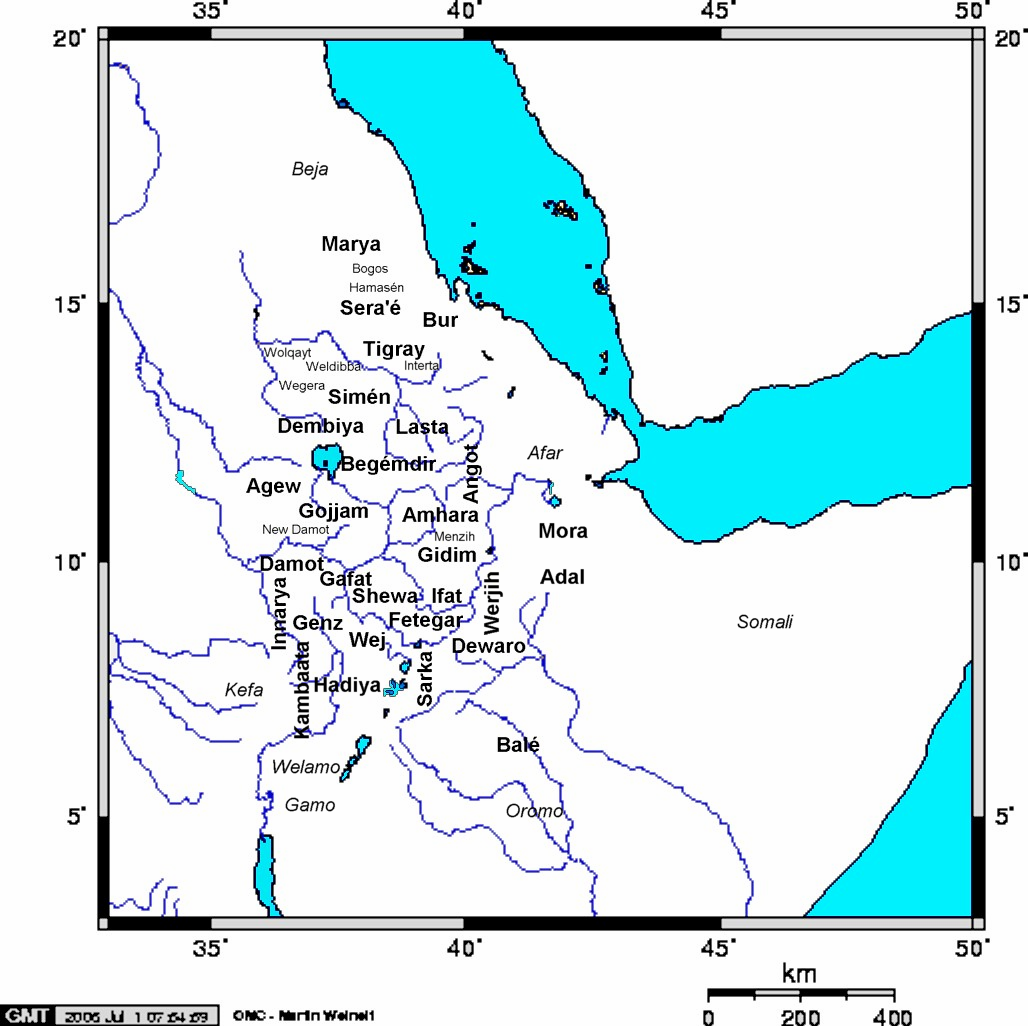
The provinces of the Ethiopian Empire under Amda Seyon I

Emperor Yekuno Amlak is considered the founder of the Ethiopian Empire. The empire was enlarged considerably during the reign of Amda Seyon I (r. 1314–1344). Reforms of its administration ensued during his reign as well; Amda Seyon's reign balanced power in Ethiopia.

=== Northern campaigns ===
Amda Seyon inherited the relatively stable realm of his father, Wedem Arad in the year 1314. One of his first actions during his reign was to bring the Tigray Province under his control by forcibly confirming the legitimacy of his Amhara-ruled dynasty, despite opposition from religious and political leaders in Axum. In Enderta, there was a movement for a resistance, particularly among the descendants of Yekuno Amlak, since the governor of the region held almost independent power and did not want to grant land to Amda Seyon in 1319. As a result, he made a punitive expedition to suppress the Ya'ebika Egzi revolt. The 14th-century national epic Kebra Nagast further elaborated on Amda Seyon's expansions, describing them as quick and successful.

=== Western campaigns ===
During the initial phase of the empire's expansion, the first kingdom to submit was Damot, followed by Shewa. By 1316, Amda Seyon had subjugated the Gojjam Province and Hadiya. In the northwest, Amda Seyon campaigned against the Jews of Semien, who posed a stiff resistance against him but were eventually subdued. They rose in rebellion again in 1332, an act to which the emperor responded by sending several regiments which managed to crush the rebellion. With his campaigns in Gojjam and Wogera, he gained control of the vast area between the Blue Nile and Tekeze River.

=== Early eastern conflicts ===
In 1328, an envoy of Amda Seyon named Tiyintay was detained and executed by Sultan Haqq ad-Din I, ruler of the Ifat Sultanate. This act angered the emperor who invaded Ifat and devastated its territory. He pursued Haqq ad-Din all the way to the coast where he defeated and captured him at the Battle of Zeila. The emperor's army then sacked Zeila and looted the vast riches in the city. After this event, Ifat along with the sultanate of Fatagar were annexed as vassal states under Sabr ad-Din II, brother of the defeated sultan.

=== War with the Muslim league ===
Beginning in the Year 1332, Sabr ad-Din, supported by Sultan Amano of the Hadiya Sultanate and Sultan Hayder of Dawaro declared war on the emperor. Sabr ad din's plan was to overwhelm the emperor by attacking his armies on several fronts simultaneously. To this end, he invited the Jews in the northwest to attack the emperor from the west. Amda Seyon became aware of the plans of the Muslim league through spies and attacked his enemies separately. His able command of his well-structured army, combined with the element of surprise, proved to be a deadly force. He first advanced on Hadiya, which he devastated; with many of its people being carried into captivity and its sultan, Amano, being captured. He then ravaged Fatagar, followed by the Sultanate of Dawaro, whose sultan Haydera was also captured. The victorious emperor then entered the territory of Ifat, ravaging it once again. Amda Seyon then sent a regiment of his army named Tekula, meaning wolves, against Sabr ad-Din who managed to escape although his palace was looted and sacked by the Tekula regiment. Eventually, however, Sabr ad-Din was captured and forced to submit, with the emperor deciding to spare his life. The Ifat Sultanate, Hadiya Sultanate, Dawaro Sultanate and Fatagar Sultanate were annexed by the emperor as tributary provinces who then appointed Jamal ad-Din I, another one of Sabr ad- Din's brothers as governor of the Muslim provinces.

=== East of the Awash river ===
Amda Seyon led his armies on a campaign to the east beyond the Awash River, where an Amir (also known as an Imam) opposed Amda Seyon's march against Zeila, but was defeated and slain by the emperor in the same year. The Emperor the advanced deep into the east, entering the lands of the peoples of Adal, Mora, Tiqo, Paguma, Labakala, Wargar and Gabala who all banded together to fight his armies. They initially managed to defeat and massacre some of the emperor's scattered troops in his absence before the emperor confronted with his main army. Although the attacked repeatedly Amda Seyon defeated and repelled them time and time again. At some point, one of them disguised himself as one of the emperor's and struck the emperor with a sword, hacking his belt and his tunic. However, Amda Seyon turned around and killed the attacker with a spear.

He then defeated the combined army of Adal, Mora, Harla Kingdom, Zeila and Dawaro at the Battle of Das, where he killed its leader, Salih. In this battle, the emperor initially found himself with a very small number of his men around in a situation the historian E.A. Wallis Budge compares to that of Ramesses II at the Battle of Kadesh. Emerging victorious despite his illness, Amda Seyon was said to have killed so many of his adversaries in the battle such that his hand was stuck to his spear by the blood of the slain, requiring force to separate it from the hand of the exhausted emperor. The emperor followed up his victory by advancing into, Talag, the residential town of the king of Adal. Upon being defeated, the king of Adal was captured and executed by Amda Seyon who devastated his territories and massacred the population.

The submission of Ifat continued after his death until the foundation of Adal in 1415 and Harar, its capital.

== Legacy ==
Amda Seyon's conquests hugely expanded the territory of the Ethiopian Empire which was more than doubled in size. Some historians have considered him as the actual founder of the Ethiopian Empire. According to historian Mohammed Hassen, "These devastating victories settled the crucial question as to which of the powers, Christian or Muslim, was to dominate the southern region for the next two centuries. The glorious victories of Amda-Siyon fastened the Amhara yoke upon the Muslim neck." States Mohammed Hassen, "It made the southern region the nerve centre of Ethiopian history. Henceforth for the next two centuries, the southern region remained the source from which the stream of history flowed in different channels. In short, the wars of Amda-Siyon made the Amhara masters of the region, and from then on there gleams around the name Amhara that halo which belongs to the great conquering nations. However, in the long run these victories failed to achieve the desired end." "The campaigns of Amda-Siyon created an empire, but they did not lay a proper foundation for the creation of a nation. In no concrete manner was there a creative marriage of cultures, a passage of ideas, an equal sharing of wealth. To the Christians the conquest meant constant enrichment. To the Muslims it meant constant destruction, pillaging and poverty."

Contemporary Egyptian historian Ibn Fadlallah al-Umari noted the following;

The king of Amhara imposes his authority on the other kings of Abyssinia;...Some of them throw themselves into the arms of the king of Amhara and are under his authority; and in their abasement and poverty, they pay him a fixed tribute.

== See also ==
- Territorial evolution of Ethiopia
