= Ali Baziyu =

'Ali Baziyu Naḥwi علي بزيو نحوي
- 2nd Sultan of Ifat; 2nd Walashma Sultan
- Reign: December 1276-1295
- Predecessor: Umar Dunyā-ḥawz
- Successor: Husayn Ibn Umar
- Died: 1295
- Dynasty: Walashma dynasty
- Religion: Islam

Ali "Baziyu" Nahwi (Arabic: علي بزيو نحوي) was the second ruler of the Sultanate of Ifat and the son of Sultan Umar Dunyā-ḥawaz. He led various military campaigns aimed at the submission and affirmation of his own hegemony on neighboring Muslim kingdoms.

== Reign ==
According to the "History of the Walasma" chronicles, his father Umar was said to have died in 1276 at the age of 120, Ali then took the throne and ruled for 20 years. He took "Baziyu" as a throne name but Al-Maqrizi and Ibn Taghribirdi both give him the nickname "Nahwi" (Arabic: نحوي). This nickname was apparently common in the Walashma dynasty as his son, Sultan Mansur Ibn Ali and his grandson Sultan Nasr ad-Din Ibn Mansur both used it. In the Harari language, "Baziyu" means "their (formally/respectfully) country."

His father started a military conquest of the Sultanate of Shewa in December 1276 but died shortly after, Ali then inherited the throne and continued the conquest, he burned the then capital of the Makhzumi sultanate, which was called Walalah, in September 1277. In August 1278, the Makhzumi Sultan Dil-marrah was reported to have departed from Walalah; this date also marks the beginning of the reign of Sultan Dil-gamis. Dil-marrah fled for protection to the Solomonic court in January 1279 and in June 1279 Dil-gamis was reported to have met the Sultan Ali Baziyu in a place called "Zuwaharu", Then occurred the Battle of Duwwanla against a certain 'Abdallah ibn Ganah which was followed by the burning of Abut in the year 1280, Ali and Dil-gamis were then reported to have returned to a place called "Hal", what followed was the Sack of Wagar in the month of ramadan (5th Jan to 3rd Feb 1280). came Dil-marrah to Abut in May 1280.

The entrance of Sultan Ali in Shewa and the assumption of his reign there took place 21 April 1280, after which he remained there for eleven nights. Sultan Ali was then reported to sojourned in several towns in the region in May 1282. A year later, he launched an expedition in Mukha in April 1283 after which the Sultan Dil-Marrah was captured and killed in May 1283. Sultan Ali then marched and occupied several other towns and territories which are named; Kabad, Karor, Abut and Hbd in the Hamilah mountains and in the same year, he reportedly annihilated a land called Tasimah.

From 6 June to 4 July 1285, Ali went on an expedition in a land called Hb'i in the chronicles, in this expedition he was reported to have sacked and completely "annihilated to the ground" two cities called Hbt and Amg; he then proceeded to raid two lands called Hma and 'Atquta and met an army at Busa.

As soon as he came back from that expedition, the Sultan Ali then deposed and killed all the kings of Shewa in August 1285 and then appointed his own ruler to Shewa which was called Mkhz, however Mkhz soon after rebelled against Ali in Ramadan of that year (31st October - 29th November 1285).

Sultan Ali answered by launching raids on him 6 February 1286, he reportedly completely "obliterated" Shewa and went as far as a place called Haddimora, as a result, the people of Shewa were said to have been dispersed in Hadiyah, they later moved to Karor in February 1287, Sultan Ali then fought a great battle at a place called Smh and then left towards Gidiyah and devastated an un-named region.

In July 1288, he led a campaign in the Region of Adal and the Mora Region which was concluded by the killing of the lord of Adal and Mora, the victorious Sultan then annexed Adal and Mora to his Kingdom. He was also reported to have led raids on the Hubat Region before occupying it. The Emirate of Adal would not be an independent sovereign state till at least the reign of Amde Seyon in which the Sultanate of Awfat lost considerable territories.

Sultan Ali reigned 20 years and died in 1295 leaving the throne for his brother Husayn.

== See also ==
- Walashma dynasty
- Ifat Sultanate
- Adal Empire
- Mogadishu Sultanate
- History of Somalia
- History of Ethiopia
