= Sultanate of Ifat =

1275–1415 Muslim state in the Horn of Africa

Sultanate of Ifat سلطنة أوفات (Arabic)
- 1275–1403
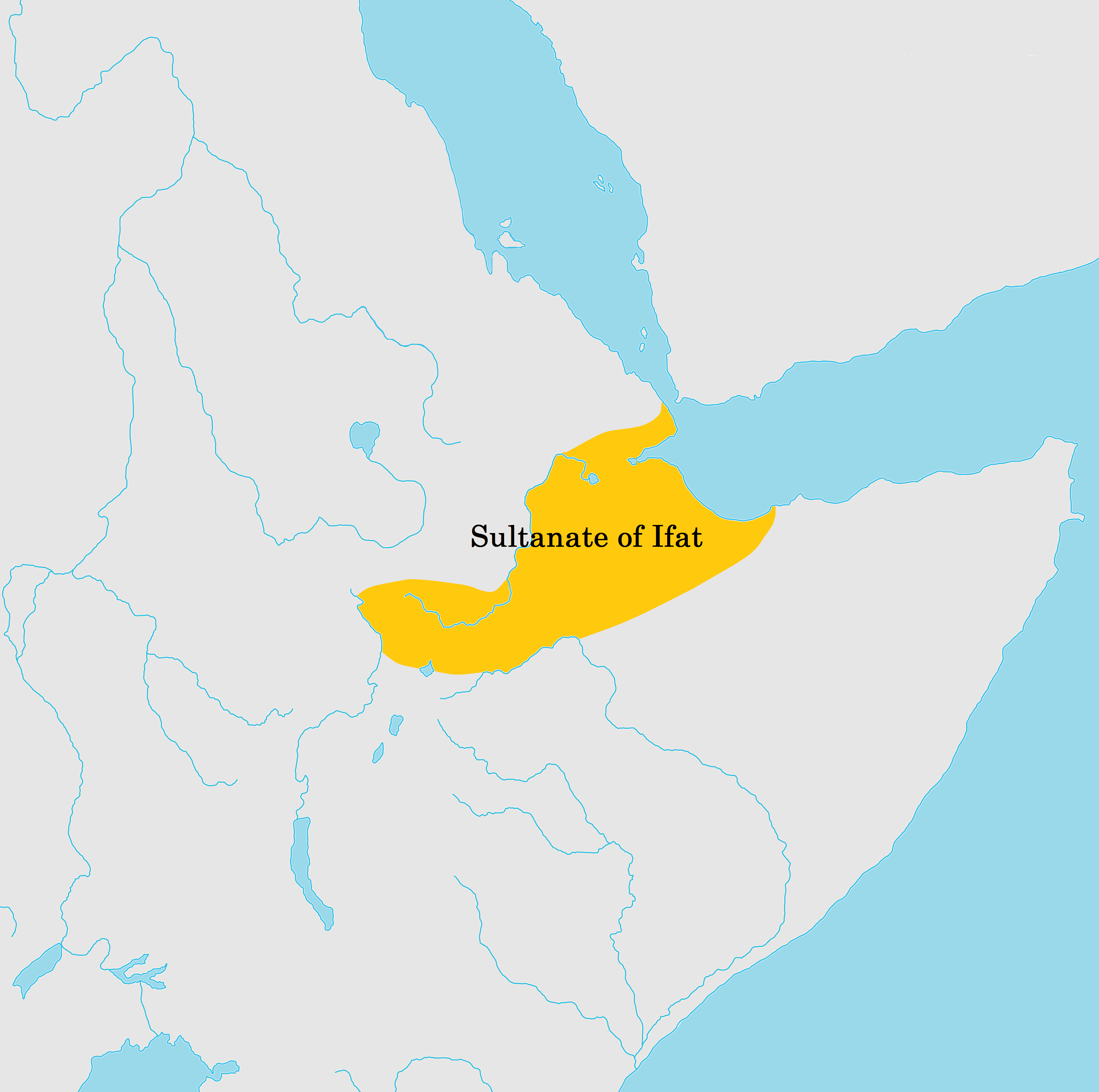
- The Ifat Sultanate in the 14th century.
- Capital: Wafāt (1275–1387); Zeila (1387–1403)
- Official languages: Arabic
- Common languages: Harari/Harla; Somali; Argobba; Afar
- Religion: Sunni Islam (state)
- Government: Monarchy
- Sultan
  - 1185–1228 (first): Umar Walasma
  - 1376–1403 (last): Sa'ad ad-Din II
- History
  - Established: 1275
  - Disestablished: 1403

Area
  - Total: 120,000 km^{2} (46,000 sq mi)
- Currency: Dinar and Dirham
Preceded by
Makhzumi dynasty
Ancient Somali city-states
Hubat
Dawaro
Harla kingdom
Succeeded by
Adal Sultanate
- Today part of: Djibouti; Ethiopia; Somalia (de jure) ∟ Somaliland (de facto)

The Sultanate of Ifat, known as Wafāt or Awfāt in Arabic texts, or the Kingdom of Zeila was a medieval Sunni Muslim state in the eastern regions of the Horn of Africa between the late 13th century and early 15th century. It was formed in present-day Ethiopia around eastern Shewa in Ifat. Led by the Walashma dynasty, the polity stretched from Zequalla to the port city of Zeila. The kingdom ruled over parts of what are now Ethiopia, Djibouti, Somaliland, Somalia.

== Location ==
The earliest account of Ifat Sultanate comes from Ibn Sa'id al-Maghribi. He says that the region is called Jabarta and its capital is called Wafāt. Its population, who are Muslim, are ethnically mixed. The city sat upon an elevated place in a valley next to a river and the inhabitants cultivate banana and sugar cane. He calculates the astronomical position of the city being 8 latitude and 57 longitude according to Arab computation, which is located on the eastern edge of Shewa. Ifat Sultanate was also alternatively known as the state of Zeila.

According to Ibn Fadlallah al-Umari, Ifat was a state close to the Red Sea coast, 15 days by 20 days "normal traveling time". The state had a river (Awash River), was well peopled and had an army of 20,000 soldiers and 15,000 horsemen. Al Umari mentioned seven cities in Ifat: Biqulzar, Kwelgora, Shimi, Shewa, Adal, Jamme and Laboo. While reporting that its center was "a place called Walalah, probably the modern Wäläle south of Šäno in the Ěnkwoy valley, about 50 miles ENE of Addis Ababa", G.W.B. Huntingford "provisionally" estimated its southern and eastern boundaries were along the Awash River, the western frontier a line drawn between Medra Kabd towards the Jamma river east of Debre Libanos (which it shared with Damot), and the northern boundary along the Adabay and Mofar rivers. The al-Umari territorial account of Ifat Sultanate implies a size of 300 kilometers by 400 kilometers, which may be an exaggeration, according to Richard Pankhurst.

According to Taddesse Tamrat, Ifat's borders included Fatagar, Dawaro and Bale. The port of Zeila provided an entry point for trade and served as the most important entry point for Islam into Ethiopian lands. Ifat rulers controlled Zeila, and it was an important commercial and religious base for them.

It was the northernmost of several Muslim states in the Horn of Africa, acting as a buffer between Christian kingdom and the Muslim states along the coastal regions. Five Ifat cities in eastern Shewa; Asbäri, Nora, Mäsal, Rassa Guba, and Beri-Ifat now mostly in ruins dating back to the fourteenth century have been located. The local Argobba people credited Arabs for building these towns. The dwellings resemble Argobba or Harari historical building designs.

== Founding of Ifat ==
Islam was introduced to the Horn region early on from the Arabian Peninsula, shortly after the hijra. Zeila's two-mihrab mosque Masjid al-Qiblatayn dates to about the 7th century, and is one of the oldest mosques in Africa. In the late 9th century, Al-Yaqubi wrote that Muslims were living along the northern Somali seaboard. Zeila transformed into a thriving and independent port city and a key center for early Muslim polities in the Horn of Africa. The Arab geographer Al-Ya'qubi offers the earliest clear reference portraying it as a vibrant, self-governing trading hub on the Somali coast. Merchants exported valuable commodities to Red Sea markets in Yemen and Egypt. Its prime location in the vicinity of the Bab al-Mandab Strait positioned it as a crucial node in transcontinental trade networks, attracting diverse populations.

The Walashma dynasty are regarded by scholars as the founders of the Ifat Sultanate. According to the Egyptian historian Al-Maqrizi, the ruling class of the Ifat Sultanate claimed Arab descent from the Hejaz. The dynasty claimed a distant origin from the Quraysh and traced its lineage to Aqil ibn Abi Talib, brother of Ali and Ja'far ibn Abi Talib, who were among the first Muslims to seek refuge in the region, according to oral tradition that has been preserved over time. Although this lineage was likely a fictitious claim intended to associate them with revered Muslim figures for the purpose of social prestige. Instead, they were most probably of local origin.

Ifat first emerged when Umar ibn Dunya-huz, later to be known as Sultan Umar Walasma, carved out his own kingdom and conquered the Sultanate of Shewa located in northern Hararghe. In 1288 Sultan Wali Asma successfully imposed his rule on Hubat, Zeila and other Muslim states in the region. Taddesse Tamrat explains Sultan Walashma's military acts as an effort to consolidate the Muslim territories in the Horn of Africa in much the same way as Emperor Yekuno Amlak was attempting to consolidate the Christian territories in the highlands during the same period.

== History ==
According to the Arab historian Maqrizi, known for his pro-Islamic version of history written around 1435, Sultan Umar Walasma was the first ruler of Ifat. Umar died around 1275, stated Maqrizi, and was succeeded by "four or five sons" with each ruling a short period. Finally, Sabr ad-Din I came to power and he ruled Ifat till the turn of the century. He was succeeded by Sultan Ali, according to Maqrizi, who was the first ruler to engage with a warfare against the Abyssinia. Sultan Ali, however soon submitted back to Ethiopian rule, because according to Maqrizi he lacked popular support. This allowed Emperor Yagbe'u Seyon to mount a campaign further west along the coast, near the vicinity of Zeila.

Before the establishment of Ifat eastern Ethiopia was ruled by the Gidaya, Dawaro, Sawans, Bali, and Fatagar. These states were incorporated into the Ifat Sultanate however they managed to maintain a source of independence after Ifat collapsed. When Ifat was abolished by the Ethiopian Empire these states were also invaded, however Fatagar still managed to stay under the control of Ifat.

=== Conflict with Abyssinia ===
In 1320 a conflict between the Christian monarch and Muslim Ifat leaders began. The conflict was precipitated by Al-Nasir Muhammad of Egypt. The Mamluk ruler Al-Nasir Muhammad was persecuting Christian Copts and destroying Coptic churches. The Ethiopian Emperor Amda Seyon I sent an envoy with a warning to the Mamluk ruler that if he did not stop the persecution of Christians in Egypt, he would retaliate against Muslims under his rule and would starve the peoples of Egypt by diverting the course of the Nile. According to Pankhurst, of the two threats, the diversion of Nile was an idle threat and the Egyptian sultan dismissed it because he likely realized this to be so. The fear that the Ethiopians might tamper with the Nile, states Pankhurst, was nevertheless to remain with Egyptians for many centuries.

As a result of the threats and the dispute between Amda Seyon and Al Nasr, the Sultan of Ifat, Haqq ad-Din I responded, initiating a definite war of aggression. He invaded the Christian Abyssinian territory in the Amhara kingdom, burnt churches and forced apostasy among Christians. He also seized and imprisoned the envoy sent by the Emperor on his way back from Cairo. Haqq ad-Din tried to convert the envoy, killing him when this failed. In response, the irate Emperor raided the inhabitants of all the land of Shewa, much of it inhabited by Muslims at that time, and other districts of Ifat Sultanate. The historical records of that time, depending on which side wrote the history, indicate a series of defeat, destruction and burning of towns of the opposite side.

According to the Christian chronicles, the son of the Sultan Haqq ad-Din Dadader Haqq ad-Din who was the leader of the Midra Zega and Menz people who were then Muslims, fought the emperor in the battle of Marra Biete in an area somewhere south of Marra Biete in modern North Shewa. Dadader forces were able to surround the emperor Amda Seyon I, who nevertheless succeeded in defeating them and killed the commander Dadader in the battle.

=== Ifat rebellion ===
Sabr ad-Din's rebellion was not an attempt to achieve independence, but to become emperor of a Muslim Ethiopia. Amda Seyon's royal chronicle states that Sabr ad-Din proclaimed:

"I wish to be King of all Ethiopia; I will rule the Christians according to their law and I will destroy their churches...I will nominate governors in all the provinces of Ethiopia, as does the King of Zion (Ethiopia)...I will transform the churches into mosques. I will subjugate and convert the King of the Christians to my religion, I will make him a provincial governor, and if he refuses to be converted I will hand him over to one of the shepherds, called Warjeke [i.e. Warjih], that he may be made a keeper of camels. As for the Queen Jan Mangesha, his wife, I will employ her to grind corn. I will make my residence at Marade [i.e. Tegulet], the capital of his kingdom.

In fact, after his first incursion, Sabr ad-Din appointed governors for nearby and neighboring provinces such as Fatagar and Alamalé, as well as far-off provinces in the north like Damot, Amhara, Angot, Inderta, Begemder, and Gojjam. He also threatened to plant khat at the capital, a stimulant used by Muslims but forbidden to Ethiopian Orthodox Christians.

Sabr ad-Din's rebellion in early 1332, with its religious support and ambitious goals, was therefore seen as a jihad rather than an attempt at independence, and it was consequently immediately joined by the nearby Muslim province of Dewaro (the first known mention of the province), under the governor Haydera, and the western province of Hadiya under the vassal local ruler Ameno. Sabr ad-Din divided his troops into three parts, sending a division north-westwards to attack Amhara, one northwards to attack Angot, and another, under his personal command, westward to take Shewa.

Amda Seyon subsequently mobilized his soldiers to meet the threat, endowing them with gifts of gold, silver, and lavish clothing – so much so that the chronicler explains that "in his reign gold and silver abounded like stones and fine clothes were as common as the leaves of the trees or the grass in the fields." Despite the extravagance he bestowed on his men, many chose not to fight due to Ifat's inhospitable mountainous and arid terrain and the complete absence of roads. Nevertheless, they advanced on 24 Yakatit, and an attachment was able to find the rebellious governor and put him to flight. Once the remainder of Amda Seyon's army arrived, they destroyed the capital of Ifat and killed many soldiers. But Sabr ad-Din once again escaped. The Ethiopian forces then grouped together for a final attack, destroying one of his camps, killing many and taking the rest as slaves as well as looting it of its gold, silver, and its "fine clothes and jewels without number."

Sabr ad-Din subsequently sued for peace, appealing to Queen Jan Mengesha, who refused his peace offer and expressed Amda Seyon's determination not to return to his capital until he had searched Sabr ad-Din out. Upon hearing this, Sabr ad-Din realized that his rebellion futile and surrendered himself to Amda Seyon's camp. Amda Seyon's courtiers demanded that Sabr ad-Din be executed, but he instead granted him relative clemency and had the rebellious governor imprisoned. Amda Seyon then appointed the governor's brother, Jamal ad-Din I, as his successor in Ifat. Just as the Ifat rebellion had been quelled, however, the neighboring states of Adal and Mora, just north of Ifat rose against the Emperor. Amda Seyon soon also put down this rebellion.

=== After the era of Amda Seyon I ===
The Muslim rulers of Ifat continued their campaign against the Christian Emperor. His son, Emperor Sayfa Arad appointed Ahmad, also known as Harb Arad ibn Ali as the sultan of Ifat and placed Ali's father and relatives in prison. Sayfa Arad was close to Ahmad and supported his rule, however, Ahmad was killed in an Ifat uprising. Ahmad's son Haqq ad-Din II then came to power in Ifat. Internal ruling family struggle in Ifat expelled grandfather Ali's son named Mola Asfah who gathered forces and attacked Ahmad's son. A series of battles affirmed Sultan Haqq ad-Din II position of power. In the fourteenth century Haqq ad-Din II transferred Ifat's capital to the Harar plateau thus he is regarded by some to be the true founder of the Adal Sultanate. The new Sultan moved away from previous capital of Ifat, to the city of Zeila. From there, he ceaselessly fought with the Emperor, in over twenty battles through 1370, according to Maqrizi's chronicle written in 1435. The Ifat Sultan Haqq ad-Din II died in a battle in 1376.

According to historian Mordechai Abir, the continued warfare between Ifat Sultanate and the Ethiopian Emperor was a part of the larger geopolitical conflict, where Egypt had arrested Coptic Church's Patriarch Marcos in 1352. This arrest led to retaliatory arrest and imprisonment of all Egyptian merchants in Ethiopia. In 1361, the Egyptian Sultan al-Malik al-Salih released the Patriarch and then sought amicable relations with Ethiopian Emperor. The actions of the Ifat Sultanate and Muslim kingdoms in the Horn of Africa, states Abir, were linked to the Muslim-Christian conflicts between Egypt and Ethiopia.

=== Decline and fall ===
In 1376, Sultan Sa'ad ad-Din Abdul Muhammad, also called Sa'ad ad-Din II, succeeded his brother and came to power, who continued to attack the Abyssinian Christian army. He attacked regional chiefs such as at Zalan and Hadeya, who supported the Emperor. According to Mordechai Abir, Sa'ad ad-Din II raids against the Ethiopian empire were largely hit-and-run type, which hardened the resolve of the Christian ruler to end the Muslim rule in their east. In the early 15th century, the Ethiopian Emperor who was likely Dawit I collected a large army to respond. He branded the Muslims of the surrounding area "enemies of the Lord", and invaded Ifat. After much war, Ifat's troops were defeated in 1403 on the Harar plateau, Sultan Sa'ad ad-Din subsequently fled to Zelia where Ethiopian soldiers pursued him. Al-Maqrizi narrates:

the Amhara pursued Sa'd al-Din as far as the peninsula of Zeila, in the ocean, where he took refuge. The Amhara besieged him there, and deprived him of water; at last one of the impious showed them a way by which they could reach him. When they came upon him a battle ensued; and after three days the water failed. Sa'd al Din was wounded in the forehead and fell to the ground, whereupon they pierced him with their swords. But he died happily, falling in God's cause.

However, no other contemporary source corroborates the invasion of Zeila, and it is thought that an Amhara incursion into Zeila was unlikely to have occurred. After Sa'ad ad-Din's death “the strength of the Muslims was abated”, as Marqrizi states, and then the Amhara settled in the country “and from the ravaged mosques and they made churches”. The followers of Islam were said to have been harassed for over twenty years.

The sources disagree on which Ethiopian Emperor conducted this campaign. According to the medieval historian al-Maqrizi, Emperor Dawit I in 1403 pursued the Sultan of Adal, Sa'ad ad-Din II, to Zeila, where he killed the Sultan and sacked the city of Zeila. However, another contemporary source dates the death of Sa'ad ad-Din II to 1410, and credits Emperor Yeshaq with the slaying.

According to Harari tradition the Argobba fled Ifat and settled around Harar in the Aw Abdal lowlands during their conflict with Abyssinia in the fifteenth century, a gate was thus named after them called the gate of Argobba. Adal Sultanate with its capital of Harar emerged in the southeastern areas as the leading Muslim principality in latter part of the 15th century. Several small territories continued to be ruled by different Walasma groups up to the eighteenth century. By eighteenth century several Christian dynasties named Yifat and Menz, which were the province names of Ifat sultanate, were established. Presently, its name is preserved in the Ethiopian district of Yifat, situated in North Shewa of the Amhara region.

== Sultans of Ifat ==
According to fourteenth-century historian Al Umari, the ruler of Ifat donned headbands made of silk.

	Ruler Name	Reign	Note
1	Sulṭān Umar Ibn Dunyā-ḥawz	1197-1276	Founder of the Walashma dynasty, his nickname was ʿAdūnyo or Wilinwīli. He started a military campaign to conquer the Sultanate of Shewa. Yusuf al-Kowneyn is his 5th ancestor.
2	Sulṭān Ali "Baziwi" Naḥwi ʿUmar	1275–1299	Son of ʿUmar DunyaHuz, he led many successful campaigns the most notable of which being the Conquest of Shewa and burning of their capital marking the end of the Makhzumi dynasty
3	Sulṭān ḤaqqudDīn ʿUmar	13??–13??	Son of ʿUmar DunyaHuz
4	Sulṭān Ḥusein ʿUmar	13??–13??	Son of ʿUmar DunyaHuz
5	Sulṭān NasradDīn ʿUmar	13??–13??	Son of ʿUmar DunyaHuz
6	Sulṭān Mansur ʿAli	13??–13??	Son of ʿAli "Baziwi" ʿUmar
7	Sulṭān JamaladDīn ʿAli	13??–13??	Son of ʿAli "Baziwi" ʿUmar
8	Sulṭān Abūd JamaladDīn	13??–13??	Son of JamaladDīn ʿAli
9	Sulṭān Zubēr Abūd	13??–13??	Son of Abūd JamaladDīn
10	Māti Layla Abūd	13??–13??	Daughter of Abūd JamaladDīn
11	Sulṭān ḤaqqudDīn Naḥwi	13??–1328	Son of Naḥwi Mansur, grandson of Mansur ʿUmar
12	Sulṭān SabiradDīn Maḥamed "Waqōyi" Naḥwi	1328–1332	Son of Naḥwi Mansur, defeated by Emperor Amde Seyon of Abyssinia, who replaced him with his brother JamaladDīn as a vassal.
13	Sulṭān JamaladDīn Naḥwi	1332–13??	Son of Naḥwi Mansur, vassal king under Amde Seyon
14	Sulṭān NasradDīn Naḥwi	13??–13??	Son of Naḥwi Mansur, vassal king under Amde Seyon
15	Sulṭān "Qāt" ʿAli SabiradDīn Maḥamed	13??–13??	Son of SabiradDīn Maḥamed Naḥwi, rebelled against Emperor Newaya Krestos after the death of Amde Seyon, but the rebellion failed and he was replaced with his brother Aḥmed
16	Sulṭān Aḥmed "Harbi Arʿēd" ʿAli	13??–13??	Son of ʿAli SabiradDīn Maḥamed, accepted the role of vassal and did not continue to rebel against Newaya Krestos, and is subsequently regarded very poorly by Muslim historians
17	Sulṭān Ḥaqquddīn Aḥmed	13??–1376	Son of Aḥmed ʿAli
18	Sulṭān SaʿadadDīn Aḥmed	1376–1403	Son of Aḥmed ʿAli, killed in the Abyssinian invasion of Ifat under Yeshaq I

== Diplomacy ==
Ifat sent an embassy under abdallah al-zaylaʿi to Cairo to the sultan of Egypt Al-Nasir Muhammad Abdallah al-zaylaʿi also taught al Umari of the territory of ifat al-Umari who wrote his Masālik al-abṣār obtained his information from Shaykh ʿAbd Allāh al-Zaylaʿī, the leader of the embassy

== Military ==
According to Mohammed Hassen Ifat's infantry consisted of the Argobba people. The first mention of the ethnonym "Somali" dates to the reign of Emperor Yishaq who had one of his court officials compose a hymn celebrating a military victory over the Sultan of Ifat's and his eponymous troops.

== People ==
Ifat's inhabitants, according to Nehemia Levtzion Randall Pouwels, and Ulrich Brakumper include nomadic groups such as Somalis, Afars and Warjih people whom were already Muslims by the thirteenth century, the Silte, the Hararis, Argobbas, the extinct Doba and Harla. Arabic was Lingua franca but the inhabitants of Ifat spoke Cushitic and Ethio-Semitic languages.

Ifat or Yifat, once the easternmost district of Shewa Sultanate, is located in a strategic position between the central highlands and the sea, and includes diverse population. Its predecessor state Shewa Sultanate is believed to be the first inland Muslim state and by the time it was incorporated into Ifat much of the inhabitants of Shewa land were Muslims. According to the chronicle of Shewa Sultanate converting the inhabitants in the area begun in 1108, and the first to convert were the Gbbah people whom J. Spencer Trimingham suggested them being the ancestors of Argobbas. A few years later after the conversion of the Gbbah people, the chronicle of Shewa sultanate mentions that in 1128 the Amhara fled from the land of Werjih. The Werjih were a pastoral people, and in the fourteenth century they occupied the Awash Valley east of Shewan Plateau.

By the mid-fourteenth century, Islam expanded in the region and the inhabitants north of Awash river were the Muslim people of Zaber and Midra Zega (located south of modern Merhabete); the Gabal (or Warjeh people today called Tigri Worji); and much of the inhabitants of Ankober, were under the Sultanate of Ifat. Tegulat, previously the capital of Shewa Sultanate, is situated on a mountain 24 km north of Debre Berhan and was known by Muslims as Mar'ade. The chronicle of Amda Tsion even mentions Khat being widely consumed by Muslims in the city of Marade. Tegulat, later became the seat of Emperor Amde Tsion, thereby, making it the capital of the empire. The emperor then appointed the descendants of Walasmas as the king of all the Muslim lands.

Ifat or Yifat, once the easternmost district of Shewa Sultanate, is located in a strategic position between the central highlands and the sea, and includes diverse population. Its predecessor state Shewa Sultanate is believed to be the first inland Muslim state and by the time it was incorporated into Ifat much of the inhabitants of Shewa land were Muslims. According to the chronicle of Shewa Sultanate converting the inhabitants in the area begun in 1108, and the first to convert were the Gbbah people whom Trimingham suggested them being the ancestors of Argobbas. A few years later after the conversion of the Gbbah people, the chronicle of Shewa sultanate mentions that in 1128 the Amhara fled from the land of Werjih. The Werjih were a pastoral people, and in the fourteenth century they occupied the Awash Valley east of Shewan Plateau.

By the mid-fourteenth century, Islam expanded in the region and the inhabitants north of Awash river were the Muslim people of Zaber and Midra Zega (located south of modern Merhabete); the Gabal (or Warjeh people today called Tigri Worji); and much of the inhabitants of Ankober, were under the Sultanate of Ifat. Tegulat, previously the capital of Shewa Sultanate, is situated on a mountain 24 km north of Debre Berhan and was known by Muslims as Mar'ade. The chronicle of Amda Tsion even mentions Khat being widely consumed by Muslims in the city of Marade. Tegulat, later became the seat of Emperor Amde Tsion, thereby, making it the capital of the empire. The emperor then appointed the descendants of Walasmas as the king of all the Muslim lands.

== Language ==
The 19th-century Ethiopian historian Asma Giyorgis suggests that the Walashma themselves spoke Arabic.

== See also ==
- Adal Sultanate
- Makhzumi dynasty
- Sultanate of Harar
- Gadabuursi Ughazate
- Harari people
