= Aw-Barkhadle =

Dakkar Aw-Barkhadle
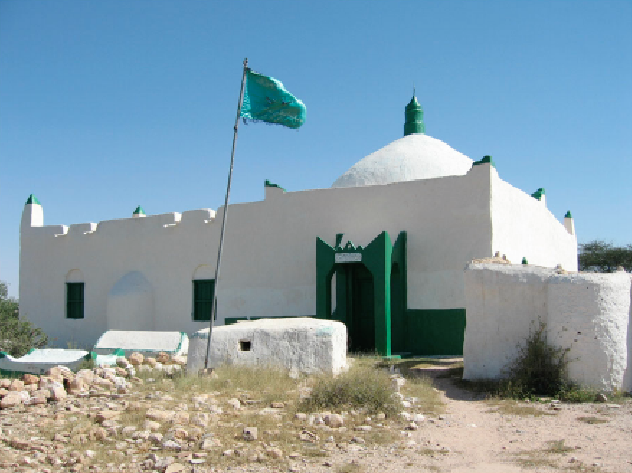
- Shrine of Yusuf bin Ahmad al-Kawneyn (colloquially known as Aw Barkhadle)

- Location in Somaliland Dakkar (Somaliland)
- Coordinates: 9°41′22″N 44°18′39″E
- Country: Somaliland
- Region: Maroodi Jeex
- District: Hargeisa District
- Elevation: 2,031 m (6,663 ft)

Aw-Barkhadle also known as Dakkar/Doggor is a town located near Hargeisa in modern-day Somaliland and served as the capital of the Adal Sultanate, it was part of the Muslim empires in the Horn of Africa during the middle ages. It was also the burial place for many of the local leaders including the rulers of the Walashma dynasty that governed the Ifat and Adal Sultanate and kingdoms. Prior to that, it was a very important pre-Islamic center.The burial site is wholly governed by the Eidagale.

== Overview ==
The site of Aw-Barkhadle includes archaeological remains, a ruined town within which the current mausoleum of Saint Aw Barkhadle is located, as well as different types of burial traditions, including Christian, Muslim, and others of non-Islamic character such as cairns, dolmens and stelae including phallic gravestones. The leaders let themselves be buried at the Aw-Barkhadle site.

However, the site was a pre-Islamic centre, and the sacred landscape includes a mountain, trees, stones and well associated with deities, most prominently the sky God Waaq. Here, everything has been given a meaning and placed in a divine order. It connects the pre-Islamic/pre-Christian with the Islamic through myths, legends and ancestor worship.

== History ==
It was the second capital of the medieval Adal Sultanate, after the polity moved its initial headquarters from Zeila in modern-day Somaliland by Sultan Badlay.

In medieval times this was a major town, with a large city wall. During the formation of the early Islamic kingdoms of Ifat and Adal, it seems that city was a religious centre that played an important ritual and ideological role.

According to Sada Mire the location of the Aw-Barkhadle shrine near Hargeisa was previously known as Doggor. Philipp Paulitschke names a place called ‘Dakar’ as the historical capital of Adal and mentions ‘AwBerkele’ although he did not seem to have known where exactly ‘Dokor,’ the centre of ‘AwBerkele’, was located. He postulated it was near Dire Dawa in Ethiopia, This is however unlikely to be the case, especially given the nature of the archaeology of the Aw-Barkhadle centre.

Paulitschke’s ‘Dakar’ refers to Dogor/Doggor and his ‘AwBekele’ refers to Aw-Barkhadle. Hence, Aw-Barkhadle’s centre is most likely to have been an early capital of the Adal sultanate.

It appears likely that Aw-Barkhadle was a place of political and ritual importance across the centuries. This view is supported by the reported use of the site as a burial place for the leaders of the Walashma dynasty. For example, a chronicle from Harar, Titled "Tarikh al-Mujahidin, discusses the death of Garaad Jibril who revolted against an ‘Uthman’, the ruler of Harar in 1569, and mentions Aw-Barkhadle, ‘the place of the great saint known as Aw Barkhadle’, as the burial place of Garaad Jibril.

The sixteenth-century record confirms the site’s ritual significance and its historical importance. The historical evidence, according to Paulitschke, explains clearly why the Walashma leaders would want to be buried here. As noted previously, not only is Saint Aw-Barkhadle credited with having spread Islam in this region; the Walashma dynasty is also genealogically linked with Saint Aw-Barkhadle, whom they claim to be the fifth ancestor in their lineage.

== Archeology ==
At the site of Aw Barkhadle there are pre-Islamic and pre-Christian burials buried inside tree trunks, in connection with the widespread belief of sacred trees that continued in conjunction with Islam. Other pre-Christian and pre-Islamic burials are the decorated Stelae Cemeteries which is part of the Cushitic tradition of stelae erection. These are usually sacred landscapes in the Horn of Africa. The grave-markers carry engravings, which include solar and geometric signs as well as schematic depictions of animals.

At the site of Aw Barkhadle it's also been found a grave marked with a stele carrying an Orthodox cross which confirms that Christianity was known here during pre-Islamic times or contemporary with Islam.

== See also ==
- Administrative divisions of Somaliland
- Regions of Somaliland
- Districts of Somaliland
