= Umar Walasma =

Umar Walasma عمر والاسمة
- 1st Sultan of Ifat; 1st Walasma Sultan
- Reign: 1197
- Successor: 'Ali Baziyu
- Died: 1276
- Issue: Ali Baziyu; Husayn Ibn Umar; Ḥusein ʿUmar; Nasr ad-Dīn ʿUmar
- Dynasty: Walasma dynasty
- Religion: Islam

Umar Ibn Dunyā-ḥawaz or Umar Walasma (Arabic: عمر والاسمة) was the first ruler of the Sultanate of Ifat and the founder of the Walashma dynasty.

== Reign ==
According to Ibn Khaldun, although being local to the Horn of Africa, Umar came as refugee to the region of Ifat and established his dynasty there. Taddese Tamrat noted according to Al-Maqrizi, the ancestors of ’Umar Walasma first settled in Jabarta, a region which he says belonged to Zeila where they moved further inland and occupied Ifat. Al-Maqrizi also says Umar Walashma was appointed by a "Haze" or a King of Ethiopia to be the first ruler of Awfat. Richard Pankhurst identifies this King as Yekuno Amlak. However some historians say it was most likely a Zagwe monarch which welcomed the Walashma' to the land of Awfât as the first Solomonids did not extend their authority beyond the Amhara, adding to that, the Zagwe monarchs were also probably more tolerant towards their Muslim counterparts.

According to local chronicles, Umar was the 5th descendant of the Sheikh Yusuf bin Ahmad al-Kawneyn also known as Aw Barkhadle, local chronicles relate:

"'Umar the son of Dunya hawaz, the son of Ahmed, the son of Muhammed, the son of Hamid, the son of Mahmud, the son of Shaykh Yusuf and that is Barkhadlah."

Ioan Lewis also mentions that in a short king-list titled "Rulers of the land of Sa'ad ad-Din", Yusuf is recognized as one of the Walashma's ancestors. Yusuf is considered as the progenitor of the Walashma dynasty.

According to the History of the Walashma, he was said to have died in 1276 at the age of 120, and had over six hundred children. But the number of his children are considered only legendary and are only seen as a literary genre to express the greatness and power of the founder of the dynasty. Thus, most historians place the end of his reign and his death at 1275, Cerulli also justifies this by saying that Umar, the founder of the dynasty, died 104 years before the commencement of Haqq ad-Din I's reign which was in 778 Hegira. So the demise of Umar and the commencement of his son Ali Baziyu‟s reign have been dated, according to history, to 674 Hegira (1275-1276).

The Shewan Sultan Dil-Marrah married his daughter in October 1271, 5 years before the Conquest of Shewa.

== Legacy ==
Umar's dynasty would go on to overthrow the ruling Makhzumi dynasty in 1280 which occupied Ifat since the ninth century.

Umar's dynasty would rule in Northeastern Africa from 1187 to 1559.

== See also ==
- Walashma dynasty
- Ifat Sultanate
- Adal Sultanate
