= Amda Seyon I =

Emperor of Ethiopia from 1314 to 1344

Amda Seyon I ቀዳማዊ ዐፄ ዐምደ ጽዮን
- Negus Nagast
- Amda Seyon I depicted on a 15th century manuscript

Emperor of Ethiopia
- Reign: 1314–1344
- Predecessor: Wedem Arad
- Successor: Newaya Krestos
- Died: 1344
- Spouse: Djan Mangasha
Regnal name
- Gebre Mesqel
- Ge'ez/Amharic: ዐምደ ፡ ጽዮን
- Amharic: አምደ ፅዮን
- Dynasty: House of Solomon
- Father: Wedem Arad
- Religion: Ethiopian Orthodox Church

Amda Seyon I, also known as Amda Tsiyon I (Note: other variations Amde Tsiyon, Amda-Tseyon, Amda Tsion) (Ge'ez: ዐምደ ፡ ጽዮን ʿAmdä ṣəyon, Amharic: አምደ ፅዮን āmde ṣiyōn, "Pillar of Zion"), throne name Gebre Mesqel (ገብረ መስቀል gäbrä mäsḳal, "Servant of the Cross"), was Emperor of Ethiopia from 1314 to 1344 and a member of the Solomonic dynasty.

The most important source for the military actions undertaken during his reign is a Ge'ez account of his 1332 campaign against Ifat and Adal, known in English from G.W.B. Huntingford's translation as The Glorious Victories. This has also come to be the name for his conquests in modern times. He is best known from this account, often called his chronicle although it covers only the campaign of 1332–1333, as a heroic warrior against the Muslims. Its two critical editors, Paolo Marrassini and Manfred Kropp, as well as its English translator Huntingford and Tedeschi, regard it as the work of a contemporary written during his reign. Bertrand Hirsch has instead proposed that it is a 15th-century epic fiction that condenses about a century of conflicts with the sultans of Ifat (c. 1330–1430) into Amda Seyon's reign, a hypothesis he presents as still needing verification. Chekroun likewise places its composition in the 15th century. Solomon Gebreyes Beyene rejects this dating, citing a Ge'ez passage at the end of the chronicle stating that it was written during the king's lifetime. Edward Ullendorff argued the work was clearly written by an eyewitness, citing its vivid depiction of the king's campaigns and its engagingly personal anecdotes about his life. Other historians like Richard Pankhurst have praised the chronicle as a "masterpiece" of historiography.

Most of his wars were against the Muslim sultanates to the southeast, which he was able to fight and generally defeat, and substantially enlarge his kingdom by gradually incorporating a number of smaller states. His conquests of Muslim borderlands greatly expanded Christian territory and power in the region, which were maintained for centuries after his death. Amda Seyon asserted the strength of the new Solomonic dynasty and therefore legitimized it. These expansions further provided for the spread of Christianity to frontier areas, sparking a long era of proselytization, Christianization, and integration of previously peripheral areas.

According to British historian Edward Ullendorff, "Amda Seyon was one of the most outstanding Ethiopian kings of any age and a singular figure dominating the Horn of Africa in the fourteenth century."

== Early life ==
It is not known how Amda Seyon became Emperor. However, a few pieces of information indicate that he may have been involved in the succession struggle against Wedem Arad.

It is argued that sufficient evidence shows that Amda Seyon was the son of Wedem Arad. However, when a deputation of monks led by Basalota Mika’el accused him of incest for marrying Emperor Wedem Arad's concubine Jan Mogassa and threatened to excommunicate him, he claimed to be the biological son of the Emperor's brother Qedma Asgad; this explanation may have had its origins in court gossip. Whatever the truth of Amda Seyon's parentage, the imperial history known as the Paris Chronicle records that he expressed his rage at his accusers by beating one of them, Abbot Anorewos of Segaja, and exiling the other ecclesiastics to Dembiya and Begemder.

The real cause of the conflict, which continued into the reign of his son Newaya Krestos, remains disputed. On the surface it was provoked by the attempt of ecclesiastics to force the Emperor to abandon old marital customs and follow Christian norms. However, the growing administrative and economic independence of the church and monastic institutions, backed by resistance from local nobility against the emperor's centralising authority, appears to have been the deeper source of tension.

== Early military campaigns ==
Taddesse Tamrat reports that he found a contemporary note written in a manuscript now kept in the island monastery of Lake Hayq, which mentions that in 1309 AM (1316/7 AD), Emperor Amda Seyon successfully campaigned against the Pagan Damot as well as the Muslim Hadiya Kingdom. The note describes his conquest of Damot, many of whose people he exiled to another area, and then the conquest of Hadiya, to whose people he did likewise. Though his early control of these regions was minimal, it is evident by 1332 (or 1329) that Hadiya had been fully integrated, providing troops for his 1332 campaigns against the Sultanate of Ifat. The King of Hadiya, Amano, refused to visit the emperor and give his tribute, encouraged by, according to Amda Seyon's chronicler, a Muslim "prophet of darkness" named Bel'am. According to the emperor's Chronicle, Bel'am told him to rebel:

Go not to the king of Seyon [i.e. Ethiopia]. Do not give him gifts: if he comes against you, be not afraid of him, for he will be delivered into your hands and you will cause him to perish with his army.

The emperor was infuriated, invading Hadiya and killing many people, and taking Amano prisoner along with many of his subjects. Bel'am, however was able to escape the emperor by fleeing to Ifat. These conquests represented a significant advancement of Amda Seyon's eventual goal of controlling the inland trade previously controlled by the Muslims in Ifat and farther east. Hadiya's conquest deeply affected the slave trade and consequently hurt the trade and wealth of the eastern Muslim provinces. For the first time, the Muslim presence in the region was threatened, which later resulted in alliances between the Muslim provinces (which often rebelled) when they had previously acted more independently of each other.

In the same year as his campaigns against the southern regions of Damot and Hadiya, the emperor also campaigned against the more northerly province of Gojjam.

== Northern campaigns ==
After his 1316/7 campaigns in the south, Amda Seyon had to turn north to strengthen his control over areas that had in the meanwhile gained more autonomy. The northern Tigrayan Enderta Province had increasingly been asserting its independence since the Solomonic restoration under Yekuno Amlak in 1270. During Yekuno Amlak's time, the governor of Enderta was Ingida Igzi', who was succeeded by his son, Tesfane Igzi'. As governor of Enderta, Tesfane Igzi' had the most power among the northern provinces and held the title Hasgwa and Aqabé Tsentsen ('keeper of the fly whisks – an ancient Aksumite title) and threatened the Amhara-based lineage currently in power. As early as 1305, Tesfane Igzi' referred to Enderta as "his kingdom," his son and successor, Ya'ibika Igzi, did not even mention the Emperor in his 1318/9 land grant. Ya'ibika Igzi eventually rebelled, unsuccessfully inviting the governor of nearby Tembien to join him.^{[e]} Amda Seyon responded swiftly, killing the governor, dividing the titles, and awarding them to individuals of distant provinces. The Emperor's appointees were unpopular, described by the chronicler as "men who were not born from Adam and Eve who were called Halestiyotat," a term literally meaning "bastard of mixed or low origins".

To consolidate his control in the region, Amda Seyon established a military colony of non-Tigrayan troops at Amba Senayata, the center of the rebellion, and appointed his queen consort, Bilén Saba(ብሌን ሳባ, as governor of Enderta, along with a new batch of officials below her. The Queen ruled indirectly however, which caused unrest in the province as the population heavily resented Amhara rule. This induced the Emperor to appoint one of his sons, Bahr Seged, as governor, who was later in 1328 also given control of the maritime provinces under the title of Ma'ikele Bahr ("Between the Rivers/Seas").

In 1329, the Emperor campaigned in the northern provinces of Semien, Wegera, Tselemt, and Tsegede, in which many had been converting to Judaism and where the Beta Israel had been gaining prominence.

Amda Seyon was also wary of Muslim power along the Red Sea coast and therefore headed to area in modern Eritrea bordering the Red Sea: "I, King Amdä-ṣiyon, went to the sea of Eritrea [i.e. "Red Sea"]. When I reached there, I mounted on an elephant and entered the sea. I took up my arrow and spears, killed my enemies, and saved my people."

During his campaign, the emperor also met the famous monk Ewostatewos, who was on his way to Armenia.

== Eastern campaigns ==
Around 1320, Sultan an-Nasir Muhammad of the Mamluk Sultanate based in Cairo began persecuting Copts and destroying their churches. Amdä Seyon subsequently sent a mission to Cairo in 1321-2 threatening to retaliate against the Muslims in his kingdom, and threatened to send a legion in conquest of Egypt after diverting the course of the Nile if the sultan did not end his persecution. Though Al-Nasir Muhammad ignored the envoys, fear of the diversion of the Nile in Egypt would continue for centuries. As a result of the dispute and threats, Haqq ad-Din I, sultan of Ifat, seized and imprisoned a member of the deputation sent by the Emperor named Ti'yintay on his way back from Cairo. Haqq ad-Din tried to convert Ti`yintay, killing him when this failed. The Emperor responded by invading Ifat accompanied by, according to Amda Seyon's royal chronicler, only seven horsemen, and killed many of the sultan's soldiers. Part of the army then followed him and destroyed the province's capital, Ifat, and Amda Seyon took much of its wealth in the form of gold, silver, bronze, lead, and clothing. Amda Seyon continued his reprisals throughout all of the provinces of Ifat as well as Harla Kingdom, pillaging Kwelgora, Biqulzar, Gidaya, Hubat, Fedis, Qedsé, Hargaya, and Shewa, populated mainly by Muslims, taking livestock, killing many inhabitants, destroying towns and mosques, as well as taking prisoners.

As a result of Amda Seyon's reprisals, other Muslim states tried to attack his army, seeing that his army had become weak from the long campaigns. The people of Gebel and Wargar who historian Taddesse Tamrat associates with Warjih, were reportedly "very skilled in warfare," subsequently attacked and pillaged some Christian regions. The people of Medra Zega and Manzih (Menz), then Muslims, also surrounded and attacked the Emperor's army, who defeated them and killed their commander Dedadir, a son of Haqq ad-Din.

=== Causes ===
The most important primary source for his reign, The Glorious Victories, describes the extensive military campaigns Amda Seyon undertook in the plains drained by the Awash River. Beginning on 24 Yakatit (18 February), the Emperor led his army against a number of enemies; another document, referring to this year, states that he defeated 10 kings. Rebellion in the Muslim provinces stemmed from the threat to Islam by Amda Seyon, magnified by the earlier loss of trade from his campaigns. This defiance was encouraged and perhaps even instigated by religious leaders in Ifat and other Muslim provinces. The "false prophet" reported as having fled from Hadiya during the 1316/7 campaigns continued spreading propaganda against the king in Ifat, where he was one of Sabr ad-Din's advisors. The chronicle states:

The false prophet fled to the land of Ifat and lived there propagating his false teaching... And when Säbrädīn asked him for council he told him saying: "The kingdom of the Christians has now come to an end; and it has been given to us, for you will reign on in Siyon [i.e. Ethiopia]. Go, ascend [the mountains], and fight the king of the Christians; you will defeat him, and rule him together with his peoples."

A second religious leader is noted as having fomented trouble in the region, specifically in Adal and Mora. He is called "Salih whose title was Qazī" (which it notes is a title similar to an archbishop), and is described as being revered and feared like God by the kings and rulers in the region. The chronicle ascribes blame to Salīh, stating that it was he "who gathered the Muslim troops, kings, and rulers" against the Emperor.

As a result of these instigations and conditions, Sabr ad-Din I, governor of Ifat as well as brother and successor to Haqq ad-Din, showed defiance to Amda Seyon by confiscating some of the Emperor's goods in transit from the coast (i.e. Zeila), similar to what his brother had done before him. Amda Seyon was furious with Sabr ad-Din, saying to him, "You took away the commodities belonging to me obtained in exchange for the large quantity of gold and silver I had entrusted to the merchants... you imprisoned the traders who did business for me."

=== Ifat campaign ===
Sabr ad-Din's rebellion was not an attempt to achieve independence, but to become emperor of a Muslim Ethiopia. Amda Seyon's royal chronicle states that Sabr ad-Din proclaimed:

"I wish to be King of all Ethiopia; I will rule the Christians according to their law and I will destroy their churches...I will nominate governors in all the provinces of Ethiopia, as does the King of Zion...I will transform the churches into mosques. I will subjugate and convert the King of the Christians to my religion, I will make him a provincial governor, and if he refuses to be converted I will hand him over to one of the shepherds, called Warjeke [i.e. Werjih], that he may be made a keeper of camels. As for the Queen Jan Mangesha, his wife, I will employ her to grind corn. I will make my residence at Marade [i.e. Tegulet], the capital of his kingdom.

In fact, after his first incursion, Sabr ad-Din appointed governors for nearby and neighboring provinces such as Fatagar and Alamalé (i.e. Aymellel, part of the "Guragé country"), as well as far-off provinces in the north like Damot, Amhara, Angot, Inderta, Begemder, and Gojjam. He also threatened to plant khat at the capital, a stimulant used by Muslims but forbidden to Ethiopian Orthodox Christians.

Sabr ad-Din's rebellion, with its religious support and ambitious goals, was therefore seen as a jihad rather than an attempt at independence, and it was consequently immediately joined by the nearby Muslim province of Dewaro (the first known mention of the province), under the governor Haydera, and the western province of Hadiya under the vassal local ruler Ameno. Sabr ad-Din divided his troops into three parts, sending a division north-westwards to attack Amhara, one northwards to attack Angot, and another, under his personal command, westward to take Shewa.

Amda Seyon subsequently mobilized his soldiers to meet the threat, endowing them with gifts of gold, silver, and lavish clothing – so much so that the chronicler explains that "in his reign gold and silver abounded like stones and fine clothes were as common as the leaves of the trees or the grass in the fields." Despite the extravagance he bestowed on his men, many chose not to fight due to the inhospitability of Ifat's mountainous and arid terrain and the complete absence of roads. Nevertheless, they advanced on 24 Yakatit, and an attachment was able to find the rebellious governor and put him to flight. Once the remainder of Amda Seyon's army arrived, they destroyed the capital and killed many soldiers, but Sabr ad-Din once again escaped. Amda Seyon's forces then grouped together for a final attack, destroying one of his camps, killing many men, women, and children, taking the rest prisoner, as well as looting it of its gold, silver, and its "fine clothes and jewels without number."

Sabr ad-Din subsequently sued for peace, appealing to Queen Jan Mengesha, who refused his peace offer and expressed Amda Seyon's determination not to return to his capital until he had searched Sabr ad-Din out. Upon hearing this, Sabr ad-Din realized that his rebellion futile and surrendered himself to Amda Seyon's camp. Amda Seyon's courtiers demanded that Sabr ad-Din be executed, but he instead granted him relative clemency and had the rebellious governor imprisoned. Amda Seyon then appointed the governor's brother, Jamal ad-Din I, as his successor in Ifat. Just as the Ifat rebellion had been quelled, however, the neighboring provinces of Adal and Mora just north of Ifat rose against the Emperor. Amda Seyon soon also put down this rebellion.

=== Adal campaign ===
After much campaigning, Amda Seyon's troops were exhausted and wished to return to their homes, pleading that the rainy season was soon approaching. Amda Seyon refused, however, saying to them:

"Do not repeat in front me what you have just said, for I will not leave so long as the ungodly Muslims make war on me, who am the King of all the Muslims of Ethiopia, and I have confidence in the help of God.

The new governor of Ifat also beseeched him to return, giving him many gifts, stating that his country was ruined and begging him not to "ravage it again," so that its inhabitants may recover and work the land for the Emperor. He promised him that if he left that Ifat and its inhabitants would serve the Emperor with their trade and tribute and that he and the Muslims of Ethiopia were the Emperor's servants. Amda Seyon rejected the governor's pleas, declaring:

"While I am attacked by wolves and dogs, by the sons of vipers and children of evil who do not believe in the Son of God, I will never return to my kingdom, and if I leave without going as far as Adal I am no longer the son of my mother; let me no more be called a man, but a woman."

Amda Seyon continued and was attacked twice in skirmishes before making camp. The Muslims returned during the night in much greater numbers, and attacked him with an army raised from the seven "great clans" of Adal: Gebela, Lebekela, Wargar, Paguma, and Tiqo. During the battle, Amda Seyon was struck from the rear by an enemy's sword, cutting his girdle around his waist and his battle dress, but the Emperor was able to turn and kill the attacker with his spear before he could strike again. According to James Bruce, the imperial army had been infiltrated by foreign agents from Harar, however Amda Seyon's men were able to apprehend and execute them. Amda Seyon emerged victorious from the battle and sent fresh troops who had not fought to pursue the surviving enemies. They were able to reach the survivors on the banks of a nearby river by morning and kill them, taking many swords, bows, spears, and clothes.

Jamal ad-Din, despite being his appointee, also joined the rebellion, collaborating with the ruler of Adal imam Salih to encircle the Emperor, to which the ruler of Adal responded by mobilizing his forces. The Ethiopian army was encircled by the two armies in the Battle of Das, but Amda Seyon was able to defeat them, despite being ill. He then led his army against Talag, the capital of Adal, where the brother of the governor of Adal and three of the governor's sons surrendered. The Emperor then defeated another governor-king, retraced his steps, returning to Bequlzar in Ifat, where he commanded Jamal ad-Din to deliver him all of the province's apostate Christians. The Emperor was first given the priests, deacons, and soldiers, who were each given 30 lashes and imprisoned as slaves. He then turned to the other traitors, whom Jamal ad-Din refused to hand over. Amda Seyon again ravaged Ifat and deposed Jamal ad-Din, appointing Nasir ad-Din, another brother of Sabr ad-Din, as governor.

Having finished campaigning in Ifat, he took his army to the town of Gu'ét, where he killed many men and captured numerous women and cattle. The Emperor then invaded the region of modern Somaliland, where he defeated an attack by the people of Harla. Amda Seyon then advanced to the town of Dilhoya. The town had previously deposed his governor by immolation, along with other Christian men and women, to which the Emperor responded by taking and looting the town and their livestock, as well as killing many of its inhabitants.

Amda Seyon then continued to Degwi, killing numerous neighboring Warjih pastoralists, who had previously attacked and pillaged some Christian areas earlier in his reign. The chronicle described the people as "very wicked," as they "neither knew God nor feared men". Before the end of the month of December, Amda Seyon ravaged the land of Sharkha and imprisoned its governor Yoseph. These efforts extended Ethiopian rule for the first time across the Awash River, gaining control of Dawaro, Bale, and other Muslim states.

At the close of this campaign, the chronicles states that Amda Seyon would eventually return to the highlands, never again to set foot in the Muslim territories, which the chronicler claims was unprecedented in the country's history. He is famous for never losing a battle. His tomb is believed to be in Adi Qelebes.

=== Dates ===
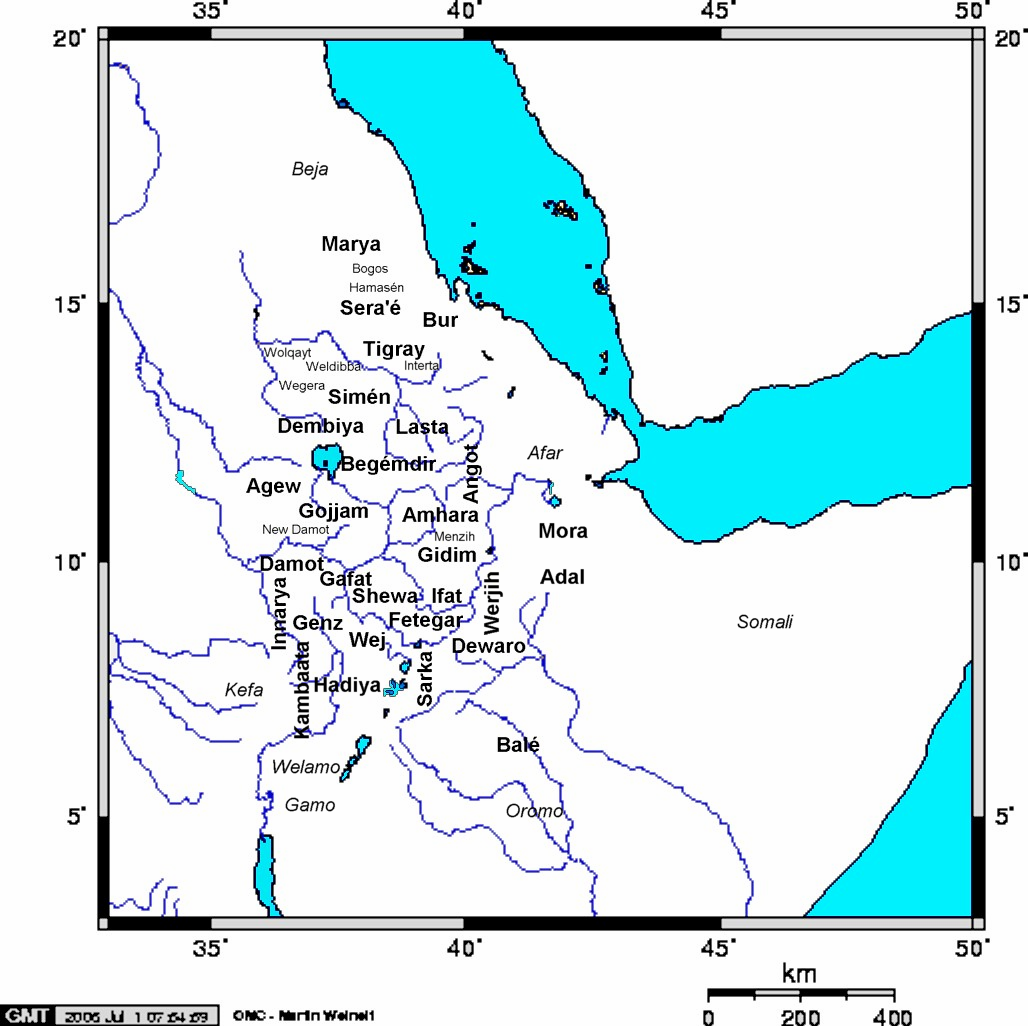
Map of medieval Ethiopian provinces, with sub-provinces in smaller lettering and neighbouring groups in italics

Two different years have been offered for when these extensive military actions occurred is disputed. In his translation of The Glorious Victories, G.W.B. Huntingford follows James Bruce in placing this in 1329. Huntingford notes that Amda Seyon is recorded as celebrating Easter on 28 Miyazya (= 24 April in 1329), which would best fit that year. However, the generally accepted year for this campaign is 1332, which is the opinion of such authorities as August Dillmann, Carlo Conti Rossini, and Enrico Cerulli. Taddesse Tamrat points to another document which dates Amda Seyon's 18th regnal year to 498 Year of Grace, which confirms that the year 516 in The Glorious Victories is correct and that the campaigns took place in AD 1332.

== Army ==
Emperor Amda Seyon's army was remarkably similar to the organization of the army during ancient Aksumite times. It consisted of two parts: the first, his central army, was very effective and closely attached to the Royal Court; the second was a much larger local militia raised in times of local crises. These local units would, as in Aksumite times, form a distinctive unit and fight together, maintaining their local character and were divided into smaller units each headed by a local ruler. From the reign of Amde Tseyon, Chewa regiments, or legions, formed the backbone of the Empire military forces. The Ge’ez term for these regiments is ṣewa (ጼዋ) while the Amharic term is č̣äwa (ጨዋ). The normal size of a regiment was several thousand men. Each regiment was allocated a fief (Gult), to ensure its upkeep ensured by the land revenue. According to "The Glorious Victories," the soldiers of Amda Seyon were from "Amhara and Sewä and Gojjam and Dämot, (men) who were trained in warfare, and dressed in gold and silver and fine clothes archers, spearmen, cavalry, and infantry with strong legs, trained for war. When they go to war they fight like eagles and run like wild goats; the (movement) of their feet is like the rolling of stones, and their sound is like the roaring of the sea, as says the prophet Herege'el: "I have heard the sound of the wings of the angels, as the noise of a camp." Such were the soldiers of 'Amda Seyon, full of confidence in war."

The central army was divided into independent regiments, each with its own specialized name, such as Qeste-Nihb, Hareb Gonda, and Tekula.^{[a]} The independent regiments competed for the king's favor, who "raised" and "nourished" them from childhood.^{[b]} The regiments were led by an intimately loyal commander directly responsible to Amda Seyon. His own son, Saf-Asegid, commanded one of these divisions, as did Amda Seyon's brother-in-law. Moreover, the commander of Qeste-Nihb, Simishehal, along with his colleague Inze-Aygeb, were described as the "most beloved" officers of the Emperor, who was distressed when he learned of their injury at the Battle of Hagera.^{[c]} The specialized regiments tied their fortune to that of the Emperor and were most likely taken from the best soldiers from around the country. Amda Seyon used them whenever quick action had to be taken, and their regiment commanders would often serve the role of governor in times of crises in certain provinces, as did Digna, the right-wing commander of the cavalry regiment Korem (named after the region/town of the same name) in 1332 then part of Tigray. His central army further consisted of regional regiments similar to those of his local militias. They were drawn mainly from newly conquered provinces and shared a cultural and linguistic heritage. Most soldiers were probably prisoners taken in the conquests, though some were undoubtedly kept as servants to the royal court, while others were exported to slave markets or given to private citizens. Those who were to serve the Emperor were given military training, probably under a commander from the same region and loyal to the Emperor. Most of these groups were broken down into smaller sections due to their size; for instance, in Amda Seyon's 1332 (or 1329) campaigns, a division of Damot fought the Beta Israel in the north, while another went to fight in the campaigns in the south against the Sultanate of Ifat.

The Emperor improved the imperial army, which until his reign was not as heavily armed as his Muslim adversaries. The 14th century Arab historian al-Umari noted regarding Ethiopian troops that

"their weapons of war are the bow with arrows resembling the nussab; swords, spears and lances. Some warriors fight with swords and with narrow and long shields. But their principal weapon is the spear which resembles a long lance. There are some [warriors] who fling darts which are [similar to] short arrows, with a long bow resembling a cross-bow."

Despite the wide variety of weapons ascribed to the Ethiopian troops by al-Umari, swords and daggers were not often used by the Ethiopian army, which was mainly armed with bows, spears, and shields for defense, along with mounted soldiers.^{[d]} The Muslims, however, are described as having "swords, daggers, iron sticks [dimbus]" and other weapons useful in close quarters, and al-Umari notes that "the arrows of the warriors of the Muslim borderlands are bigger" than those of the Solomonic army. The Ethiopian army's strength was mainly numerical, but Amda Seyon did much to improve his army's equipment, increasing the use of swords and daggers (probably obtained through Muslim traders), and creating a special regiment armed with swords. The Emperor also formed a special regiment of shield-bearers that was probably used to guard his archers.

== Trade and culture ==
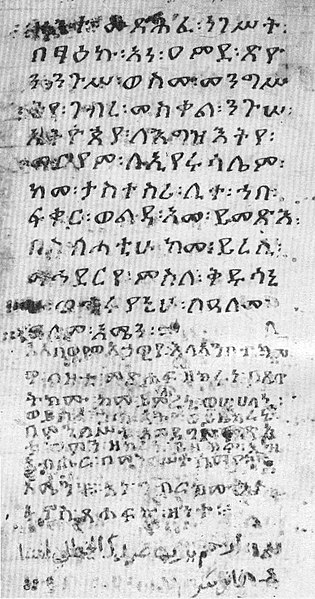
Ge'ez Letter of Amde Siyon, 'King of Ethiopia,' preserved in the Vatican Library

Trade flourished under Amda Seyon. Archeological investigations in the treasuries of Ethiopian churches and monasteries have recovered coins, textiles and other objects that prove the existence of trade with the Byzantine Empire. Taddesse Tamrat also notes that he had a Syrian secretary from a Christian family of Damascus, who helped him keep in close touch with events in the Middle East.

Some of the earliest works of Ethiopian literature were written during Amda Seyon's reign. Perhaps the best known is the Kebra Nagast, which is said to have been translated from Arabic then. Other works from this period include the Mashafa Mestira Samay Wamedr ("The Book of the Mysteries of Heaven and Earth") written by Giyorgis of Segla, and the Zena Eskender ("History of Alexander the Great"), a romance wherein Alexander the Great becomes a Christian saint. Ullendorff has identified a tradition that at this time the Ge'ez translation of the Bible was revised. Also worth mentioning is that four of the Soldiers Songs were composed during the reign of Amda Seyon, and are the earliest surviving extants of Amharic to date.^{[f]} Lastly, Amda Seyon is the first king recorded as having donated to the library of the Ethiopian community at Jerusalem. The first named horse in the region's history was that of Amda Seyon I in his royal chronicle "The Glorious Victories." This would set the groundwork for the Horse name in Pre-Modern Ethiopia

"The most common form of written history sponsored by the Solomonic royal court was the biography of contemporary rulers, who were often lauded by their biographers along with the Solomonic dynasty. The royal biographical genre was established during the reign of Amda Seyon, whose biography not only recounted the diplomatic exchanges and military conflicts with the rival Islamic Ifat Sultanate, but also depicted the Ethiopian ruler as the Christian savior of his nation. The chronicle titled, The Glorious Victories of Amda Seyon, is far more detailed than any previous Ethiopian work of history and is regraded by historian Richard Pankhurst to be a "masterpiece in historical chronicling". The origins of the dynastic history (tarika nagast) are perhaps found in the biographical chronicle of Baeda Maryam I (r. 1468–1478), which provides a narrative of his life and that of his children and was most likely written by the preceptor of the royal court. Teshale Tibebu asserts that Ethiopian court historians were "professional flatterers" of their ruling monarchs, akin to their Byzantine Greek and Imperial Chinese counterparts. For instance, the anonymously written biography of the emperor Gelawdewos (r. 1540–1549) speaks glowingly of the ruler, albeit in an elegiac tone, while attempting to place him and his deeds within a greater moral and historical context."

== Legacy ==
"These devastating victories settled the crucial question as to which of the powers, Christian or Muslim, was to dominate the southern region for the next two centuries. The glorious victories of Amda-Siyon fastened the Amhara yoke upon the Muslim neck." States Mohammed Hassen, "It made the southern region the nerve centre of Ethiopian history. Henceforth for the next two centuries, the southern region remained the source from which the stream of history flowed in different channels. In short, the wars of Amda-Siyon made the Amhara people masters of the region, and from then on there gleams around the name Amhara that halo which belongs to the great conquering nations. However, in the long run these victories failed to achieve the desired end." "The campaigns of Amda-Siyon created an empire, but they did not lay a proper foundation for the creation of a nation. In no concrete manner was there a creative marriage of cultures, a passage of ideas, an equal sharing of wealth. To the Christians the conquest meant constant enrichment. To the Muslims it meant constant destruction, pillaging and poverty."

Despite the scale of his conquests, Amda Seyon's empire had almost no administrative apparatus. He had no fixed capital and spent most of his time with his most loyal troops, collecting tribute or subjugating territories. Refusal to pay tribute or show loyalty was immediately answered with a punitive campaign. To maintain control in parts of the kingdom, he settled entire military units there or granted land to his officers. Most regions were held together predominantly by military force, and the new empire, several times larger than that of his predecessors, remained very heterogeneous in ethnic and religious terms.

Amda Seyon was the first Ethiopian emperor to become known in Europe. Around 1350 he appears under the name "Abdeselib," derived from the Arabic rendering of his regnal name Gäbrä Mäsqäl, in the Spanish geographical work Book of Knowledge of All Kingdoms. He later appeared in Ludovico Ariosto's Orlando Furioso.

== See also ==
- Solomonic dynasty
- Walashma dynasty
- Ewostatewos

== Notes ==
a. Taddesse Tamrat notes that, according to Jules Perruchon, Tekula literally means "jackal," while Qeste-Nihb means "the sting of the bee."
b. Seeing many of his soldiers flee at the sight of the powerful armies of Jamal ad-Din and of Adal, the sick Amda Seyon noted: "Have you forgotten, besides, that it was I who raised, you, nourished you, and covered you with ornaments of gold and silver and precious clothes!"
c. Simshehal's name also appears as "Semey" in a list of governors with the title Ma'ikele-Bahr (lit. "between the rivers/seas," a northern maritime province) and in the Royal chronicle as "Sumey (-shehal)" and "Simiy (-shihal)." Inze-Aygab also appears once as "Yanz-Aygeb."
d. According to Taddesse Tamrat, though the royal chronicle describes Amda Seyon as being armed with a sword, the chronicler only refers to the Emperors skill with the bow and arrow, spear, and shield; Taddesse further notes in a footnote that swords seem to only be used in a ceremonial manner in contemporary hagiographies.
e. According to Taddesse Tamrat, from traditional indications in the hagiography of Abiye Igzi'.
f. A translation with notes of these four songs is included in The Glorious Victories, pp. 129–134.

== Citations ==
Regnal titles
Preceded by Wedem Arad	Emperor of Ethiopia; 1314–1344	Succeeded by Newaya Krestos
