= Mahfuz =

Emir of Harar and Governor of Zeila in the Adal Sultanate

- Imam of Zeila; Emir of Harar; Garad

Leader of Adal
- Reign: 1490–1517
- Predecessor: Muhammad ibn Azhar ad-Din
- Successor: Muhammad ibn Azhar ad-Din
- Died: July 1517
- Issue: Bati del Wambara; Ahmadosh bin Mahfuz
Names
- Mohammed
- Religion: Islam

Mahfuz (or Mohammed) (Harari: መሕፉዝ, Arabic: محفوظ, Portuguese: Mafudi, Somali: Maxfuud; died July 1517) was a Garad, Emir of Harar and Governor of Zeila in the Adal Sultanate. Although he was originally only emir of a small region he would rise to become leader of Adal due to his popularity, wielding more power than the sultan of Adal. He is often known as the "Captain of Zeila" in medieval texts.

== Background ==
According to Ethiopian historian Mohammed Hassen, he was either of Harla or Harari origin. However Marco Demichelis asserts he was of Somali origin, his ethnic origins of Somali descent is also supported by Sidney R. Welsh, as well as other sources. In contrast, Daryll Forde considers him an ethnic Afar. Mahfuz was the governor of Zeila, a historic city on the Somali coast.

== Life and reign ==
Mahfuz began to dominate politics in the 1480s, being awarded multiple titles. He preferred to continue the conflicts with the Ethiopian Empire, as he desired to sway influence over the Muslim border provinces of Ifat, Fatagar, Dawaro, and Bale, which was in stark contrast to the policy of coexistence favored by Sultan Muhammad ibn Azhar ad-Din and his moderate faction. Mahfuz had successfully led expeditions into Abyssinia's heartland, including Shewa, something the Adal sultans had failed to accomplish in the previous years.

Medieval Portuguese missionary Francisco Álvares described the aftermath following the invasion of Fatagar by Mahfuz:

Mafude took them all prisoners, and he ordered the peasants to be separated from the men-at-arms, and he ordered the cultivators to go in peace, and to sow for next year much wheat and barley for when he should come, so that he and his people might find enough to eat for themselves and their horses. And he said to the men-at-arms: ‘Scoundrels who eat the King’s bread, and guard his lands so badly, all of you to the sword;’ and he ordered fifteen men-at-arms to be killed, and returned with great booty, and without any opposition what ever.

By the 1490s, political leadership shifted from Muhammad ibn Azhar ad-Din to Mahfuz. Although the Walasma dynasty retained nominal control of the sultanate, Adal's power dynamics shifted significantly, impacting Ethiopia. Mahfuz, unhappy with Muhammad's policy of compromise with the Christian neighbor, called for jihad. This gained support in Adal, Ethiopia's Muslim borderlands, and across the Red Sea, where traders welcomed the rise in war captives for the Arab slave markets. He made strong connections with the Arabia and sent slaves to the Sherif of Mecca. The Sherif rewarded him with a green silk standard and a tent of black velvet embroidered with gold. He was also made the Sheikh of Zeila by the Sherif, which made Mahfuz responsible for bringing the Key of Abyssinia to him.

Francisco Álvares states that his invasions began during the reign of Eskender, and lasted 25 years. Mahfuz is reported to have caused the deaths of Ethiopian Emperors Na'od and Eskender. The British explorer, Richard Burton asserted that Mahfuz had offered a bribe to one of Emperor Eskender's escorts in order to orchestrate the emperor's murder. According to the emperor Sarsa Dengel chronicles, Mahfuz was linked to the Malassay army unit.

In his later life Mahfuz would also periodically continue to lead raids into the frontier provinces of Abyssinia for a number of years. He selected the season of Lent for his attacks, when the defenders were weakened by their fasts. He raided the Amhara, Shewa, and Fatagar provinces south of the Awash River. During his raids Mahfuz exclusively targeted Abyssinian soldiers capturing them however left civilians unharmed. He and Muhammad ibn Azhar ad-Din would descend upon the regions of Ifat, Dawaro and Fatagar which resulted in the slaying of 19,000 Christians within a year.

According to Alvarez, upon reaching the age of majority, Emperor Lebna Dengel decided to forgo his observance of Lent and oppose the Imam in battle, despite the advice and wishes of his councilors and people. He sent spies out to determine Imam Mahfuz's plans for that year, and learning the Imam was in Fatagar led his army there. He found Imam Mahfuz with the sultan of Adal encamped on a plain that was surrounded by mountains. After first sending soldiers out to secure the passes, the Abyssinian Emperor closed upon Imam Mahfuz. Although Imam Mahfuz managed to enable Sultan Muhammed to escape with but four horsemen, Imam Mahfuz knew he was trapped and sought to die with honor. He called to the Abyssinians a challenge to fight in single combat, and Gabra Endreyas, who had been a follower of Emperor Lebna Dengel's father, accepted and split the Imam's body into two from the lower-part of his neck to his shoulder with a two-handed sword. Mahfuz's head was cut from his body and displayed publicly in the Emperor's court where Gabra exclaimed "There is the Goliath of the Infidels". After defeating Mahfuz, Dawit II used appellation Wanag Segad, which is a combination of Ge'ez and Harari terms.

== Legacy ==
His death led to a power struggle between the radical and moderate factions in Adal with the followers of Mahfuz essentially prevailing. Garad Abun arranged Imam Ahmad ibn Ibrahim's marriage with Mahfuz's daughter, Bati del Wambara as it would help establish a formal alliance and continue Mahfuz's tradition of jihad. Ten years after Mahfuz's death, Imam Ahmad embarked on a Conquest of Abyssinia (Futuh al-Habash). Ahmed ibn Ibrahim al-Ghazi later in his invasion of Abyssinia would kill an old Gabra as revenge for his victory against Mahfuz. His son Garad Ahmadus bin Mahfuz participated in the conquest. Garad Ahmadus was later responsible for slaying patrician Limu, the lord of Sharkha and Nagada Iyasus, the governor of Jinah.

According to Asma Giyorgis, Mahfuz perished at a place that is still referred to today as Mafud in north Shewa.

== See also ==
- Ahmad ibn Ibrahim al-Ghazi
