= Dakkar =

Historical Muslim town located in present-day eastern Ethiopia

Dakkar (Harari: ደክከር Däkkär, Somali: Doggor), also known as Dakar, or Deker, was a historical Muslim town located in present-day eastern Ethiopia or present day Somaliland. It served as the first capital of the Adal Sultanate after its founding in the early 15th century by Sabr ad-Din III.

According to a marginal note on a manuscript of the "Futuh al-Habasha", Dakkar was located about 65 km northeast of Harar (near Mount Kundudo). Enrico Cerulli, Bahru Zewde and other historians identify Dakkar as being located one km southeast of Harar. However, Richard Pankhurst states that the city was situated near the village of Funyan Bira and G. W. B. Huntingford believes that it was in the town of Chinaksen near Jigjiga. Archaeologist and historian Sada Mire identified the shrine of Aw Barkhadle, in the Waqooyi Galbeed region of Somaliland, as the location of the historical town of Dakar.

== History ==
The exact location of the town remains unknown and several locations have been suggested, but it is generally agreed that the town was somewhere in the Harar plateau. The city was established in the early 15th century by Sabr ad-Din III after he returned from his exile in Yemen. The town sat along the trade route to Zeila and served as the royal seat of the Walashma sultans. However, in 1471 Emir Laday Usman marched to Dakkar and seized power. But Usman did not dismiss the Sultan from office, and instead gave him a ceremonial position while retaining the real power for himself. Adal now came under the leadership of the powerful regional aristocracy who governed from the palace of a nominal Sultan.

In 1478, the Ethiopian Emperor Eskender invaded Adal and marched towards Dakkar where he burnt the town to the ground. All of its mosques and buildings were looted and destroyed by the Abyssinians which caused great damage to the town. The city was also sacked during emperor Lebna Dengel's raids on Adal subsequently laying waste to Sultan Muhammad ibn Azhar ad-Din's residence.

After the death of Mahfuz, Adal would fall into a succession crisis and Sultan Abu Bakr ibn Muhammad would rise to power. Sultan Abu Bakr then relocated the capital of Adal to Harar in 1520. Dakkar was reportedly surrounded by ramparts by the late sixteenth century. According to Harari records during the Oromo invasions, Dakkar was destroyed alongside other states such as Sim, Gidaya and Hargaya.

== Demographics ==
Historian Mohammed Hassen states the sedentary demographic included the Semitic-speaking Harari and Harla people, while the nomadic demographic consisted of the Somali and other groups. Antoine d'Abbadie notes that the Barento Oromo had occupied Dakkar from the Bursuuk which they had integrated in their mythology.

== See also ==
- Harar
- Zeila
- Adal Sultanate
