= Shams ad-Din ibn Muhammad =

Shams ad-Din ibn Muhammad شمس الدين بن محمد
- Sultan of the Sultanate of Adal
- Reign: 1472–1487
- Dynasty: Walashma dynasty
- Religion: Islam

Shams ad-Din ibn Muhammad (Arabic: شمس الدين بن محمد) (reigned 1472–1487) was a Sultan of the Sultanate of Adal and a son of Muhammad ibn Badlay.

== Reign ==
During Shams ad-Din's reign, an army of the Emperor of Ethiopia Eskender invaded Adal (around 1479–1480) and looted Dakkar, destroying houses and places of worship. However, on its return home the Adal forces ambushed the Ethiopian army and inflicted heavy casualties. As a result, no further expeditions were sent against Adal by the Ethiopians until the reign of Emperor Na'od.

== See also ==
- Walashma dynasty

== Notes ==
| Preceded by Muhammad ibn Badlay | Walashma dynasty | Succeeded by Muhammad ibn Azhar ad-Din |
