= Sabr ad-Din I =

Sultan of Ifat (fl. 1332)

Sabr ad-Din I صبر الدين الأول
- Emir of the Ifat Sultanate
- Reign: flourished 1332
- Died: 1332
Names
- Sabr ad-Din I
- Dynasty: Walashma dynasty
- Father: Nahwi bin Mansur bin Umar Walashma
- Religion: Islam

Sabr ad-Din I (fl. 1332) was a sultan of Ifat. He was the son of Nahwi bin Mansur bin Umar Walashma and younger brother of Haqq ad-Din I.

== Reign ==
Sabr ad-Din rallied his fellow Muslims in a counter-offensive in early 1332 against the Christian Ethiopians, he attacked christian garrisons, burned churches, enslaved the people and forced the clergy to convert to Islam. However, the chronicles of the King Amda Seyon I say he eventually got defeated in battle, Amde seyon then invaded a number of Islamic kingdoms, including Dawaro and Bale. This brought an end to the independent kingdoms of Hadiya, Fatagar, Dawaro and Ifat.

Sabr ad-Din was captured with his ally, King Haydara of Dawaro, and the two were imprisoned together. The Emperor Amda Seyon appointed as his successor his brother, Jamal ad-Din I.

== See also ==
- Sabr ad-Din II
- Walashma dynasty

== Notes ==
| Preceded by Haqq ad-Din I | Walashma dynasty | Succeeded by Jamal ad-Din I |
