= Chewa regiments =

Military nobility of pre-modern Ethiopia

Chewa (Amharic: ጨዋ; č̣äwa) were the feudal noble warrior class of Imperial Ethiopia. Originally recruited and appointed for service in the Emperor's army, they formed a class of professional soldiers also known for traditional warriorhood practices and a rich cultural background. They were allocated with land grants for their sustainement. Their installation in settlements were instrumental in creating the nucleus of urban centers as well as the land tenure system through Ethiopia and Eritrea. By the early 20th century, scholars had identified 66 villages in Eritrea with Chewa origins. Multiple locations, such as Jan Amora, were named after prestigious Chewa regiments.

== Terminology ==
In Ethiopia in the Middle Ages, from the reign of Amda Seyon I, Chewa regiments, or legions, formed the backbone of the military.

The Geʽez term for these regiments is ṣewā (ጼዋ), while the inborrowed Amharic version is č̣äwa (ጨዋ). Earlier Aksumite sources refer to sarāwit "regiments" (singular sarwe; Amharic särwe "military leader) as the name for the regiments, each sarwe headed by a nəguś. In late sources, from the Era of the Princes onwards, regional levies under a noble are referred to as waʿāliyān "partisans, retainers".

Among the Beta Israel, the term Ibrawi "a Hebrew" was used for free people instead of č̣äwa.

== History ==
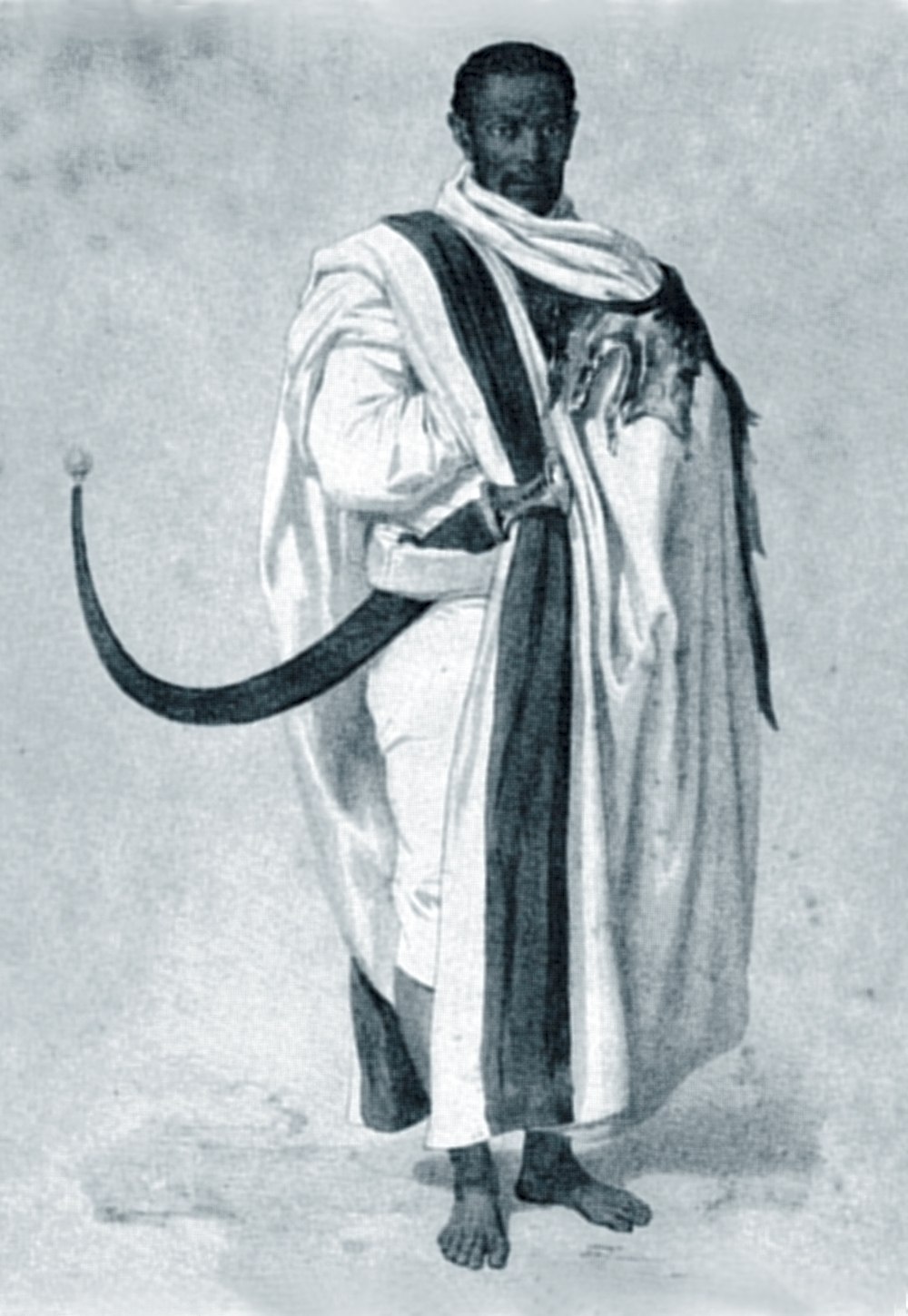
A Chewa nobleman

=== Medieval period ===
Although the origins of several Chewa regiments such as the Jan Amora predate the establishment of Yekuno Amlak's dynasty, their real development occurred mostly under the latter, as well as Amda Seyon I, Baeda Maryam I and Zara Yaqob.

The normal size of a regiment was several thousand men. Each regiment was allocated a fief (gult) to ensure its upkeep ensured by the land revenue.

In 1445, following the Battle of Gomit, the chronicles record that Zara Yaqob began garrisoning the provinces with Chewa regiments.

Name of regiment	Region	Translation
Bäṣär waǧät	Serae, Dawaro, Menz, Gamo	Enemy of the waǧät
Säwä Hadari	Shewa	
Ǧan amora	Dobe'a, Tselemt, Gedem	Eagle of the majesty
č̣äwa Bale	Bale	
č̣äwa Maya	Bahir Negash	
Bäṣur amora	Gamo	Spear of the eagle
Bäṣär šotäl	Damot	Sword of the foe
Damot Hadari	Damot	

Major divisions of the military were :

- Regiments at the court, under high court officials
- Regiments in the provinces, under regional Rases or other officials
- Regiments in border regions, or more autonomous provinces, such as Hadiya, Bahir Negash, Bale, under azmač, who were military officials appointed by the king.

According to The Glorious Victories, the soldiers of Amda Seyon were from

Amhara and Sewä and Gojjam and Dämot, (men) who were trained in warfare, and dressed in gold and silver and fine clothes, archers, spearmen, cavalry, and infantry with strong legs, trained for war. When they go to war, they fight like eagles and run like wild goats; the (movement) of their feet is like the rolling of stones, and their sound is like the roaring of the sea, as says the prophet Herege'el: "I have heard the sound of the wings of the angels, as the noise of a camp." Such were the soldiers of 'Amda Seyon, full of confidence in war.

=== Modern period ===
One of the Chewa regiments, known as the Abe Lahm in Geez, or the Weregenu, in Oromo, lasted, and participated to the Battle of Adwa, only to be phased out in the 1920s.

The modern army was created under Ras Tafari Makonnen, in 1917, with the formation of the Kebur Zabagna, the imperial guard.

== Philosophy ==
Medieval Ethiopia was a highly militaristic nation based on a system of ethnic regiments known as ṣewa. This practice can be traced back to the beginning of the Aksumite period, when the men of newly subjugated tribes were forced to become soldiers for the king of Aksum, commanded by a tributary who was likely a local chief. The regiments were given a plot of land called a gult in exchange for their military service.

Merid Wolde Aregay suggests, based on Christopher Ehret's linguistic theories, that the origin of Aksumite rule itself may have been through the subjugation of Agaw agriculturalists by Geʽez-speaking pastoralists. These regiments were instrumental in maintaining Aksumite sovereignty over the trade routes within its empire. However, because the regiments were decentralized, chiefs could easily rebel against the king. T

The regimental system continued through the Middle Ages, but by the Zagwe era, they consisted of professional soldiers. In the Solomonic era, during the reign of Zara Yaqob, this professionalism was reflected in the Amharic term č̣äwa, as ṣewa carried a connotation of slavery which was no longer accurate.

== Arts and Zeraf poetry ==
The Zeraf were narrations of accomplishment of a warrior success. Generally given during the course of military banquets, they constituted by both of a self declaration loyalty to ones masters, and ones accomplishments.

== Weapons & Education ==
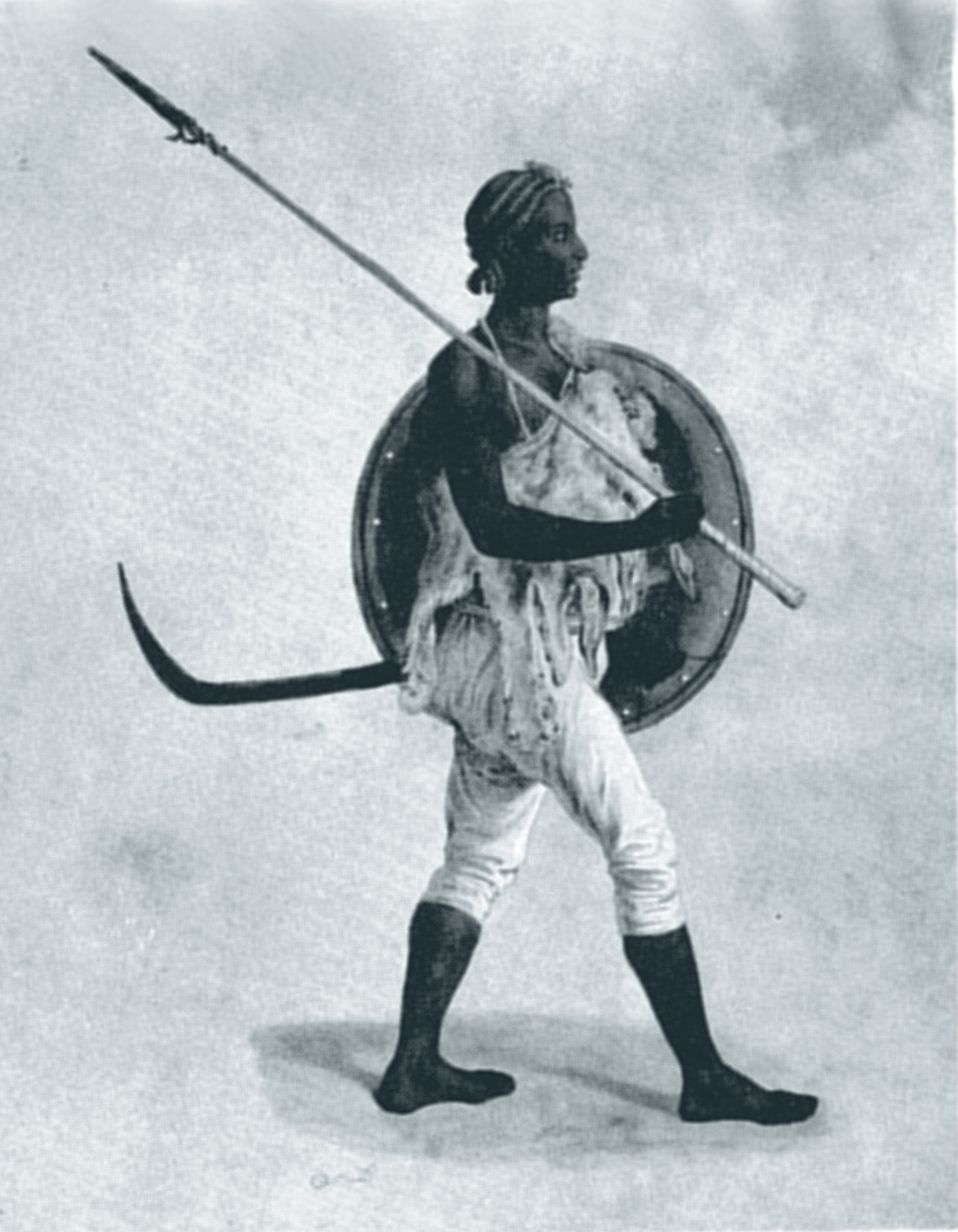
"A lancer of Tigre"

The classic weapons of antiquity and medieval Ethiopia were the shotel (sabre) and spear (t'or). Distance weaponry such as bows and javelins (armah) were practised. Armour such as chain mail was also employed. Matchlocks and light artillery were introduced and became widespread under the reign of Dawit II.

The Chewa acquired proficiency in weapon use from a young age, being trained from childhood with games such as akandura (darts) and gena (a kind of field hockey).

Hunting (aden) traditions played an important role in the upbringing of a Chewa warrior. The killings of wild beasts were rewarded by the patron, or mäkonn, to whom the Chewa belonged. An elephant-killer would, for example, wear a silver chain around his neck and a gold earring in his right ear. A rhinoceros-killer would be awarded a cross earring and a gold chain with silk threads for his neck. Along with these jewellery gifts, prizes of weaponry were also frequent.

== Bibliography ==
- Merid W. Aregay, Military Elites in Medieval Ethiopia, Journal of Ethiopian Studies Vol. 30, No. 1 (June 1997), pp. 31–73,
- Ishikawa Hiroki, Changes in the Military System during the Gondar Period (1632–1769): Their Influence on the Decline of the Solomonic Dynasty, Annales d'Éthiopie Vol. 18, (2002) pp. 215–229,
- Tewolde Berhan Gebre Egziabeher, Firearms in rural and traditional Ethiopia and human rights, United Nations University Press, 1993,
