= Battle of Gomit =

1445 battle between the Ethiopian Empire and Adal Sultanate

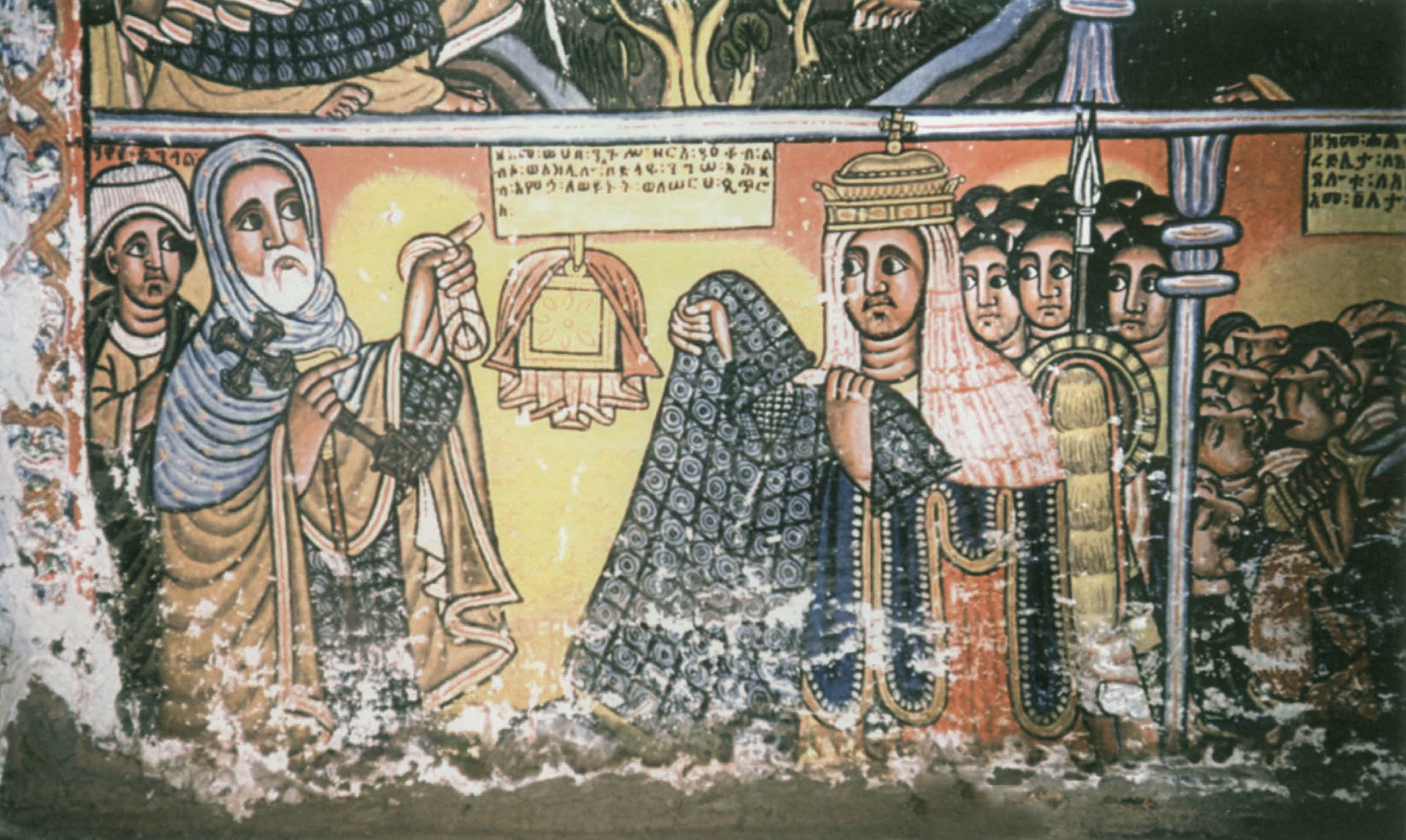
- Zara Yaqob gifting the garment and the crown of Badlay as a present to Waynut and Sarsa Petros at Debre Werq
Date	25 December 1445
Location	Dawaro, Ethiopian Empire
Result	Ethiopian victory

Belligerents
Ethiopian Empire	Adal Sultanate

Commanders and leaders
Zara Yaqob; Hassab Bawassan	Badlay ibn Sa'ad ad-Din †; Kayr ad-Din ibn Sa'ad ad-Din †

Strength
Unknown	Unknown

Casualties and losses
Minimal	Heavy; "entire force annihilated"

The Battle of Gomit or Battle of Egubba (or Battle of Ayfars (Note: alternatively Aifars) was fought in 1445 between the Ethiopian Empire and a powerful Muslim army under the Adal Sultanate. The Ethiopians were led by Emperor Zara Yaqob, while the forces of Adal were led by Sultan Badlay ibn Sa'ad ad-Din. The Ethiopian army was victorious, and Badlay was slain.

== Battle ==
Badlay first invaded the Ethiopian province of Dawaro in 1443, and again in 1445, but while in Dago, the Emperor Zara Yaqob received news that the Sultan Badlay ibn Sa'ad ad-Din was advancing to attack him. He then marched south with the army of his vassal Hassab Bawassan to confront Badlay in Dawaro.

Garad Mohammed, the governor of Hadiya Province and the emperor's father in-law, offered his help to both the sultan and the emperor. The emperor, who suspected the Garad of dessertion due to his Muslim faith, ordered him to camp near Ayfars while the trusting sultan was deceived.

After arriving near the camp of the sultan, the emperor was afraid seeing the size of the Adalite army which greatly outnumbered his. The emperor then prayed to God to help him and the small force he had with him win the day. Despite being advised against an assault, especially as "he had made no plan of battle, and had not even arrayed himself in his panoply of war," the king, putting his confidence in God, ordered the sounding of battle-drums and trumpets, and attacked the Adalites, quickly breaking through their lines. The sultan, who didn't expect Zara Yaqob to lead his army in person, was greatly disturbed as the emperor approached him.

Early in the battle, an Abyssinian soldier shot an arrow at the face of Sultan Badlay, who caught it in his hand. Sultan Badlay then charged at Zara Yaqob in an attempt to capture him, but in response, Zara Yaqob used his spear to strike Badlay and slit his throat. When the Muslims saw that Badlay was dead, they took to flight, but were pursued by the Abyssinians who cut them down as they fled.

As the Adalite forces retreated, they were led by the Sultan's brother, Khair ad-Din. While attempting to cross the Awash River, they were taken by surprise and fell into an ambush by an Abyssinian general named Djan Sagana. After this victory, Djan Sagana sent the head of Khair ad-Din to the Emperor. The chronicles assert that the entire Adalite army was annihilated in this battle. However, according to Richard Pankhurst, this may have been an exaggeration. Zara Yakob pursued the Muslim army as far as the Hawash River and captured booty which seemed absolutely marvelous to the Christian Ethiopians; in fact, the commercial relations that existed between the Adal Sultanate and the rulers of the Arab peninsula allowed Muslims to obtain luxury items that Christian Ethiopians, whose relations with the outside world were blocked, could not get. Christian documents describing the Sultan Badlay report:

“And the robes [of the sultan] and those of his leaders were adorned with silver and shone on all sides. And the dagger which he [the sultan] carried at his side was richly adorned with gold and precious stones; and his amulet was adorned with drops of gold; and the inscriptions on the amulet were of gold paint. And his parasol came from the land of Syria and it was such beautiful work that those who looked at it marveled, and winged serpents were painted on it."

Badlay's remains were dismembered and sent to different provinces. Additionally, the possessions of both him and his wife, including their diverse collection of robes, were distributed among several monastic communities. Despite this victory, the Zara Yakob decided not to conquer the Adalites, believing they were outside of the Christian boundary and shouldn't be included in his kingdom. However, historian Mohammad Hassan states Adal's territorial defense capabilities persuaded the Ethiopian monarch from attempting to occupy the state.

== Aftermath ==
The Royal Chronicle of Zara Yaqob reports that the emperor cut Badlay's body into pieces and sent the parts to different parts of his realm: his head to a place called "Amba", and other parts of his body to Axum, Manhadbe (possibly the Manadeley Francisco Álvares visited in the 1520s), Wasel (near modern Dessie), Jejeno (likely Mekane Selassie), Lawo (possibly Lawo Gabaya), and Wiz (location unknown).

Following the battle, the chronicles record that Emperor Zara Yaqob started garrisoning the provinces with Chewa regiments. The king rewarded Mehmad, the Garad of Hadya, with robes of honour, and all the loot taken from Badlay's camp was divided among the churches of Dabra Metmak, Seyon and other sanctuaries. Then Zara Yaqob returned to his native village of Telk in the province of Fatigar, building a temple for Saint Michael, and in the place where his father lived, two other churches, Martula Mika'el and 'Asada Mika’el. Finally, in 'Enzarda he built a church called Dabra Sehin. The property of the initially successful Badlay and his wife, including his robes of all colours, were shared given to various monasteries after his defeat. Despite his brilliant victory, Zara Yaqob did not try to colonize Adal and include it within the Christian kingdom. He considered Adal "the land of the Muslims outside the Christian boundary." Following the battle, the chronicles record that Emperor Zara Yacoq started garrisoning the provinces with Chewa regiments. After dismembering the Adal sultan's body and plundering his treasures, the Emperor of Ethiopia decided not to conquer the Adalites, believing they were outside of the Christian boundary and shouldn't be included in his kingdom.

According to Somali historian Mohamed Haji Mukhtar the Adalite sultan Muhammad ibn Badlay, son of the slain sultan, conceded an annual tribute to the Ethiopian emperor Zara Yaqob in the same year.
