= Harla kingdom =

Middle-Age state in modern eastern Ethiopia

- 501–1500
- Capital: Hubat??
- Common languages: Harla
- Religion: Traditional religion(s); (before c. 701); Islam; (after c. 701)
- Government: Monarchy
- History
  - Established: 501
  - Disestablished: 1500
Succeeded by
Makhzumi dynasty; Harar
- Today part of: Ethiopia; Djibouti; Somalia

The Harla kingdom was a sixth-century Harla state centered around what is present day eastern Ethiopia. It is regarded as the most powerful state in the region after the fall of the adjacent Kingdom of Axum in the 7th century. Its territory stretched from Great Rift Valley in southern Ethiopia to the northern area of modern Djibouti prior to the advent of Islam in the region. Timothy Insoll identifies the Harlaa ruins to be Hubat the capital of the Harla state, a subordinate of Ifat Sultanate in the thirteenth century and later under the Adal Sultanate as an autonomous tribal confederation in the fifteenth century. Researcher Dominico Patassini states the Harla kingdom was succeeded by Harar city-state in the sixteenth century.

== History ==
The kingdom had trading relations with the Ayyubid and Tang dynasties. It also established its own currency and calendar. Early Muslim states in the Horn of Africa such as the Makhzumi dynasty had their bases within Harla territories. In the Islamic period the state is recorded by Ethiopian as well as Arab medieval writers including al-Mufaddal ibn Abi al-Fada'il and Ibn Sa'id al-Maghribi. According to historian Mohammed Hassen a power struggle had developed in the early sixteenth century between Harla state leaders and the Walashma dynasty.

Recent excavations indicated consumption of wild pigs were prevalent in Harla as opposed to in neighboring kingdom of Aksum. The excavations were done by the Institute of Arab and Islamic Studies of the University of Exeter as part of the Becoming Muslim project at the urban sites of Harlaa in 2017–2019, Harar in 2014–2018, and Ganda Harla 2014, located in the eastern part of Ethiopia. Substantial assemblages of faunal remains were recovered over the seasons.

The Harlaa archaeological site is located 40 km north-west of Harar and 15 km southeast of Dire Dawa and is the ‘Harla’ stone-built towns and funerary monuments whose origins are ascribed by the Oromo people to a legendary ancient race of giants who occupied the region before the Oromo arrived in the area. Harlaa was a large urban centre covering an area of around 500m east to west and 900m north to south excluding outlying cemeteries. It was composed of several elements including a central settlement area, workshops, three early mosques, wells, lengths of fortification wall, and cemeteries to the north, east, and west. Harlaa predates both Harar and Ganda Harlaa and provided the longest chronology with dates spanning between the mid-sixth and early fifteenth century.

The Harar site is situated in the Harar Plateau in a more heavily vegetated landscape, having an area of 1000×800 m, and at its core the historic city of Harar which is surrounded by a wall and is accessed by five gates. The excavations indicated that occupation in Harar postdated the fifteenth century and that the city and its mosques were linked with the establishment of Harar as the capital of the Sultanate of Adal.

The Ganda Harla is an abandoned settlement located 12.5 km southeast of Harar on a hill west of the village of Sofi and is linked with the Harla in local tradition. The zooarchaeological data indicated the inhabitants were hunters of wild animals in open terrain and scrub hillsides with the exception of Kobus kob which are more commonly found at lower elevations such as in valleys and riverine grasslands. The locals also kept domesticated animals such cattle (Bos taurus/indicus), goat (Capra hircus), sheep, and transport livestock such as donkey, horse and camel. The excavations also uncovered significant evidence for manufacturing and participation in regional and international Red Sea and western Indian Ocean trade networks. The study concluded the inhabitants use of heavy knives and carcass dismemberment showed they had cultural commonalities with the Islamic world of Arabia, Anatolia, Mesopotamia, Levant, and Iberia despite the lack of butchery discussions in zooarchaeological literature from the Islamic world and their non-observance of Islamic dietary laws.
