= Badlay ibn Sa'ad ad-Din =

4th Sultan of Sultanate of Adal

Badlāy ibn Saʿd ad-Dīn بدلاي بن سعد الدين
- Sultan

Sultan of the Adal Sultanate
- Reign: 1433-1445
- Predecessor: Jamal ad-Din II
- Successor: Muhammad ibn Badlay
- Died: 25 December 1445; Dawaro
- Badlay ibn Sa'ad ad-Din II
- Dynasty: Walashma dynasty
- Religion: Islam

Badlāy ibn Saʿd ad-Dīn II (Arabic: بدلاي بن سعد الدين) (also known as Shihāb ad-Din Aḥmad Badlāy, Arwe Badlay – "Badlay the Beast" (died 25 December 1445) was a Sultan of the Adal Sultanate and a son of Sa'ad ad-Din II. Brought numerous Christian lands under Muslim rule and contributed to expanding Adal's reach and power in the region. The polity under Sultan Badlay controlled the territory stretching from port city of Suakin in Sudan to covering the whole Afar plains to the Shewa and Chercher Mountains to include a significant part of northern Somalia.

== Reign ==
After succeeding his brother Jamal Ad-Din, Sultan Badlay moved the capital of Adal to Dakkar (a few miles southeast of Harar) upon his ascension; Richard Pankhurst states that he founded that town.

In the next few years he continued his predecessor's policy of confrontation with the Christian Ethiopian Empire and he carried out several successful expeditions and succeeded in capturing the province of Bale. He brought numerous Christian lands under his rule, and burnt many of their towns, Al-Maqrizi says, and he burnt many churches in the Christian Ethiopian lands. He also killed many Christian leaders, and seized their inhabitants, together with much booty. He and his men collected a great deal of wealth, in gold, silver, clothes and armour, as well as many slaves.

Some Christian documents attribute to him very ambitious plans of not only recovering the frontier Muslim provinces but also of leading a major Jihad against the whole of the Christian highlands, over which he is said to have actually nominated prospective governors. He collected numerous levies from the allies of the Adal Sultanate across a vast region, stretching from the Bait Mala in northern Eritrea to Meqdush (Mogadishu).

Sultan Badlay also apparently had a fair taste for luxury, the commercial relations that existed between the Adal Sultanate and the rulers of the Arab peninsula allowed Muslims to obtain luxury items that Christian Ethiopians, whose relations with the outside world were still blocked, could not acquire, a Christian document describing Badlay relates:

"And the robes [of the sultan] and those of his leaders were adorned with silver and shone on all sides. And the dagger which he [the sultan] carried at his side was richly adorned with gold and precious stones; and his amulet was adorned with drops of gold; and the inscriptions on the amulet were of gold paint. And his parasol came from the land of Syria and it was such beautiful work that those who looked at it marveled, and winged serpents were painted on it."

In 1445, he invaded the Ethiopian province of Dawaro, and again in 1445, before Emperor Zara Yaqob defeated and killed him in the Battle of Gomit. The Royal Chronicle of Zara Yaqob reports that the Emperor cut Badlay's body into pieces and sent the parts to different parts of his realm: his head to a place called "Amba", and other parts of his body to Axum, Manhadbe, Wasel (near modern Dessie), Jejeno, Lawo, and Wiz. In retaliation for the death and dismemberment of Badlay, the Mamluk Sultan of Egypt ordered the patriarch of Alexandria to be tortured and threatened to execute him. The situation would eventually be defused when Yaqob freed an imprisoned Egyptian envoy.

== See also ==
- Walashma dynasty

== Notes ==
Preceded by Jamal ad-Din II	Walashma dynasty	Succeeded by Muhammad ibn Badlay
