= Muhammad ibn Azhar ad-Din =

Muhammad ibn Azhar ad-Din محمد بن الأزهر اد الدين
- Sultan

Sultan of the Adal Sultanate
- 1st reign: 1488–1490
- Predecessor: Muhammad ibn Badlay
- Successor: Mahfuz
- 2nd reign: 1517-1518
- Predecessor: Mahfuz
- Successor: Abun Adashe
- Dynasty: Walashma dynasty
- Religion: Islam

Muhammad ibn Azhar ad-Din (Arabic: محمد بن الأزهر الدين) (reigned 1488–1518) was a Sultan of the Adal Sultanate. Sihab ad-Din Ahmad states in his Futuh al-Habasha that he was the son of Azhar, the second son of Abu Bakr, one of the ten sons of Sa'ad ad-Din II, and ruled for 30 years.

== Reign ==
In 1513, Afonso de Albuquerque had left for Zeila wounded from the Siege of Aden. He had a fever there, and he said that the artillery of the ships would kill many people inside the city. The Tahirid governor of Aden had written to Sultan Muhammad asking him to send all the ships he could gather and all the men he could pay. Sultan Muhammad replied to the letters by telling him to seek his own remedy, as he had his own people to guard his land. Later in 1515, Sultan Muhammad sent three ships loaded with grain to support the invading Mamluk army, which was attempting to seize control of Yemen and overthrow the Tahirid dynasty. However, the governor of Hodeidah intercepted and seized the ships before they could reach the army.

Sultan Muhammad attempted to remain at peace with the Emperor Na'od, but his efforts were foiled by the frequent raids of Imam Mahfuz. He was present with Imam Mahfuz when Emperor Lebna Dengel attacked and destroyed the Imam's army in Dawaro in 1516. Lebna Dengel would then proceed to lay waste to Muhammad Azhar ad-Din's residence in Dakkar during his invasion of Adal.

Muhammad was murdered upon his return from an expedition against Ethiopia a few years after the Imam's death. J. Spencer Trimingham states that he was succeeded as Sultan of Adal by Garad Abun ibn Adash, who was not a member of the Walashma dynasty; Arab Faqīh, however, writes that it was his relative in marriage, Muhammad bin Abu Bakr bin Mahfuz, who succeeded him as Sultan. Richard Pankhurst follows Trimingham's general account, noting that Adal "was then torn apart by intestinal struggles, five sultans succeeding one another within two years."

== See also ==
- Walashma dynasty

== Notes ==
Preceded by Shams ad-Din ibn Muhammad	Walashma dynasty	Succeeded by Abu Bakr ibn Muhammad
