= Jamal ad-Din I =

Jamal ad-Din جمال الدين
- Governor of Ifat
- Reign: mid-14th century
- Predecessor: Sabr ad-Din I
- Successor: Nasr ad-Din
Names
- Jamal ad-Din I
- Dynasty: Walashma dynasty
- Religion: Islam

Jamal ad-Din (Arabic: جمال الدين) (flourished mid-14th century) was a governor of Ifat. He was the son of Nahwi b. Mansur b. Umar Walashma (Umar ibn Dunya-huz) and a brother of Haqq ad-Din I.

== Reign ==
The Emperor of Ethiopia Amda Seyon I made Jamal ad-Din Governor of Ifat after the defeat and imprisonment of his brother Sabr ad-Din I. Taddesse Tamrat notes that Jamal ad-Din had been released from prison upon his appointment, and speculates that the Emperor had held onto the noble as a hostage to guarantee the loyalty of Ifat.

However, according to the Glorious Victories of Amda Seyon, Jamal ad-Din proved unfaithful to Emperor Amda Seyon. First, he allegedly was part of the alliance with Adal led by Salih that attacked, and was defeated by, the Emperor in the Battle of Das; towards the end of that same year, Jamal ad-Din was ordered to deliver apostate Christians to the Emperor for punishment, but refused, although he did produce the "son of his brother". For this, Emperor Amda Seyon ravaged Ifat and replaced Jamal ad-Din with his brother Nasr ad-Din. The interpretation of this passage varies: Trimingham holds he joined the alliance of Mora and Adal in revolt against the empire, but they were defeated by the Emperor. On the other hand, Taddesse Tamrat states that Jamal's rebellion never got that far, and he was recalled to the Ethiopian court and returned to prison on the pretext that he failed to find and bring to the Emperor all of the Christians who had converted to Islam. Jamal ad-Din alleged that the "son of his brother" (whom Taddesse Tamrat speculates might be the son of Sa'ad ad-Din) had prevented him from doing so.

== See also ==
- Jamal ad-Din II
- Walashma dynasty

== Notes ==
Preceded by Sabr ad-Din I	Walashma dynasty	Succeeded by Ali ibn Sabr ad-Din
