= Muhammad ibn Badlay =

5th Sultan of Adal Sultanate

Muhammad ibn Badlay محمد بن بدلاي
- Sultan

Sultan of the Adal Sultanate
- Reign: 1445–1471
- Predecessor: Badlay ibn Sa'ad ad-Din
- Successor: Muhammad ibn Azhar ad-Din
- Dynasty: Walashma dynasty
- Religion: Islam

Muḥammad ibn Badlāy (Arabic: محمد بن بدلاي; r. 1445–1471) was a Sultan of the Sultanate of Adal. He was the son of Badlay ibn Sa'ad ad-Din. During his reign the Adalite ruler Muhammad and the Solomonic ruler Baeda Maryam agreed to a truce and both states in the following decades saw an unprecedent period of peace and stability.

== Reign ==
After the death of Badlay, he was succeeded by his son Muhammad in year 1445. The Arab writer al-Tagrebirdi reports that Sultan Muhammed sent an embassy to Cairo in 1452, this message doubtlessly reported on his father's Badlay's defeat, which may have been an unsuccessful appeal for help.

During his reign and the reign of Emperor Ba'eda Maryam, Adal was independent, but was worn out by the constant ensuing raids and counter raids. This led to Muhammad early in his reign to send a deputation to Ba'eda Maryam, which brought him gifts of many pieces of cloth and, a message proposing peace. The envoy's according to the chronicle, declared that the ruler of Adal would send Ba'eda Marya tribute, if he in return would order all his troops to cease their incursions into his territory. The Emperor accepted this proposal, gave the envoys plentiful food and drink, and provided them with fine clothes, then sent them on their way back along with one of his messengers to Muhammad accepting the latter demands and told him "stick to your word".

Tribute was never sent, and the local Adalite leaders rejected the proposal. While Ba'eda Maryam was preparing for his coronation after choosing a consort at Aksum, he had then later learned that the governor of Zayla Lada'e Uthman, had, however, repudiated the agreement made by his predecessor Muhammad, and was marching against him. He thereupon canceled the proposed coronation celebrations and summoned the leaders of Tigray.

He then proceeded to march towards Adal, because it was outside of the Emperor's control. On arriving there they found that the chiefs of the area had all gathered to prepare for an incursion into the Christian empire. A battle ensued. Gabra Iyasus was victorious. Many Adal chiefs were killed and others taken prisoner. Gabrya Iyasus and his men did not stick around in the torrid Adal lowlands in which highlanders found to be virtually impossible to reside for any length of time. They immediately returned.

Not to long after Ba'eda Maryam planned another expedition to Adal. He entrusted it to his oldest and most loyal follower, Mahari Krestos, and to the experienced Gabra Iyasus. The monarch presented them and the soldiers with fine clothing and ordered his palace troops to join the expedition. The men went in to war, however with little enthusiasm, for which reason the chronicles says "God did not favour them".

The Adal soldiers immediately seized the offensive. Mahari Krestors and his men soon took flight and Gabra Iyasus and his followers shortly afterwards did the same. This was their undoing as they were pursued and they were said to have "Perished to the last man".

Despite the conflicts detailed above, there were also attempts at co-existence between the Emperors and the Adal Kings. Alvares claims moreover that dynastic marriages with the latter were forged, although details of any such arrangements have unfortunately been preserved. In any case, Sultan Muhammad reversed the policy of his predecessors, making a truce with the Emperor of Ethiopia Baeda Maryam, and during his reign lived in peace with the Ethiopians.

== See also ==
- Walashma dynasty

== Notes ==
Preceded by Badlay ibn Sa'ad ad-Din	Walashma dynasty	Succeeded by Shams ad-Din ibn Muhammad
