= Walashma dynasty =

Medieval Muslim dynasty in the Horn of Africa

Walashma Dynasty الولاسميون House of Walashma
- Country: Ifat Sultanate; Adal Sultanate
- Origin: Ifat
- Founded: 1275
- Founder: Umar Walasma
- Final ruler: Barakat ibn Umar Din
- Titles: Sultan (Ifat, Adal)
- Deposition: 1559

The Walashma dynasty was a medieval Muslim dynasty of the Horn of Africa founded in Ifat (modern eastern Shewa). Founded in the 13th century, it governed the polities of Ifat and Adal in what are present-day Somalia, Djibouti, Eritrea and eastern Ethiopia.

== History ==
During the end of the 13th century, northern Hararghe was seat of a Muslim sultanate named under the rule of Makhzumi dynasty. A contemporary source describes the sultanate being torn apart by internal strafe and weakened by struggles with neighboring Muslim states. In 1278 one of these neighboring states, named Ifat in eastern Shewa, led by the Walashma invaded the Sultanate of Shewa. After a few years of struggle the sultanate was annexed into Ifat. This annexation is usually attributed to ʿUmar, but he had been dead for 50 years by the time Shewa was annexed. More likely, it was his grandson Jamal ad-Dīn or perhaps even his great-grandson Abūd. In 1288 Sultan Wali Asma successfully conquered Hubat, Adal and other Muslim states in the region. Making Ifat the most powerful Muslim kingdom in the Horn of Africa.

In 1332, the Sultan of Ifat, Haqq ad-Din I was slain in a military campaign against the Abyssinian Emperor Amda Seyon's troops. Amda Seyon then appointed Jamal ad-Din as the new King, followed by Jamal ad-Din's brother Nasr ad-Din. Despite this setback, the Muslim rulers of Ifat continued their campaign. The Abyssinian Emperor branded the Muslims of the surrounding area "enemies of the Lord", and again invaded Ifat in the early 15th century. After much struggle, Ifat's troops were defeated and the Sultanate's ruler, King Sa'ad ad-Din II, fled to Zeila. He was pursued there by Abyssinian forces, where they slayed him.

Adal was a general term for a region of lowlands inhabited by Muslims east of the province of Ifat. It was used ambiguously in the medieval era to indicate the Muslim inhabited low land portion east of the Ethiopian Empire. Including north of the Awash River towards Lake Abbe as well as the territory between Shewa and Zeila on the coast of Somaliland. According to Ewald Wagner, Adal region was historically the area stretching from Zeila to Harar. In the late fourteenth century Walasma princes Haqq ad-Din II and Sa'ad ad-Din II relocated their base to the Harari plateau in Adal forming a new Sultanate.

The last Sultan of Ifat, Sa'ad ad-Din II, was killed in Zeila after he had fled there in 1403, his children escaped to Yemen, before later returning to the Harar plateau in 1415. In the early 15th century, Adal's capital was established in the town of Dakkar, where Sabr ad-Din III, the eldest son of Sa'ad ad-Din II, established a new base after his return from Yemen. By the late 1400s the Walasma sultans began to be challenged by the Harla emirs of the Harar plateau with rise of Imam Mahfuz.

Adal's headquarters were relocated in the following century, this time to Harar. From this new capital, Adal organised an effective army led by Imam Ahmad ibn Ibrahim al-Ghazi (Ahmad "Gurey" or Ahmad "Gran") that invaded the Abyssinian empire. This 16th century campaign is historically known as the Conquest of Abyssinia (Futuh al-Habash). During the war, Imam Ahmad pioneered the use of cannons supplied by the Ottoman Empire, which he imported through Zeila and deployed against Abyssinian forces and their Portuguese allies led by Cristóvão da Gama. Some scholars argue that this conflict proved, through their use on both sides, the value of firearms like the matchlock, musket, cannons and the arquebus over traditional weapons.

In 1577, Muhammad Gasa moved the capital from Harar to Aussa due to the pressure put on Harar after the Oromo invasions, founding the Imamate of Aussa.

The Walashma sultans also apparently had a fair taste for luxury, the commercial relations that existed between the Adal Sultanate and the rulers of the Arab peninsula allowed Muslims to obtain luxury items that Christian Ethiopians, whose relations with the outside world were still blocked, could not acquire, a Christian document describing Sultan Badlay relates:

"And the robes [of the sultan] and those of his leaders were adorned with silver and shone on all sides. And the dagger which he [the sultan] carried at his side was richly adorned with gold and precious stones; and his amulet was adorned with drops of gold; and the inscriptions on the amulet were of gold paint. And his parasol came from the land of Syria and it was such beautiful work that those who looked at it marveled, and winged serpents were painted on it."

=== Sultans of Ifat ===
	Ruler Name	Reign	Note
1	Sulṭān ʿUmar Dunya-Hawaz	1197–1276	Founder of the Walashma dynasty, his nickname was ʿAdūnyo or Wilinwīli. He started a military campaign to conquer the Sultanate of Shewa. The Sheikh Yusuf al-Kowneyn is his 5th ancestor.
2	Sulṭān ʿAli "Baziyu" Naḥwi ʿUmar	1276–1299	Son of ʿUmar Dunya-Hawaz, he led many successful campaigns the most notable of which being the Conquest of the Shewa and burning of their capital marking the end of the Makhzumi dynasty.
3	Sulṭān ḤaqqudDīn ʿUmar	12??–12??	Son of ʿUmar Dunya-Hawaz
4	Sulṭān Ḥusein ʿUmar	12??–12??	Son of ʿUmar Dunya-Hawaz
5	Sulṭān NasradDīn ʿUmar	12??–12??	Son of ʿUmar Dunya-Hawaz
6	Sulṭān Mansur ʿAli	12??–12??	Son of ʿAli "Baziyu" ʿUmar
7	Sulṭān JamaladDīn ʿAli	12??–12??	Son of ʿAli "Baziyu" ʿUmar
8	Sulṭān Abūd JamaladDīn	12??–12??	Son of JamaladDīn ʿAli
9	Sulṭān Zubēr Abūd	12??–13??	Son of Abūd JamaladDīn
10	Māti Layla Abūd	13??–13??	Daughter of Abūd JamaladDīn
11	Sulṭān ḤaqqudDīn Naḥwi	13??–1328	Son of Naḥwi Mansur, grandson of Mansur ʿUmar
12	Sulṭān SabiradDīn Maḥamed "Waqōyi" Naḥwi	1328–1332	Son of Naḥwi Mansur, defeated by Emperor Amde Seyon of Abyssinia, who replaced him with his brother JamaladDīn as a vassal.
13	Sulṭān JamaladDīn Naḥwi	1332–13??	Son of Naḥwi Mansur, vassal king under Amde Seyon
14	Sulṭān NasradDīn Naḥwi	13??–13??	Son of Naḥwi Mansur, vassal king under Amde Seyon
15	Sulṭān "Qāt" ʿAli SabiradDīn Maḥamed	13??–13??	Son of SabiradDīn Maḥamed Naḥwi, rebelled against Emperor Newaya Krestos after the death of Amde Seyon, but the rebellion failed and he was replaced with his brother Aḥmed
16	Sulṭān Aḥmed "Harbi Arʿēd" ʿAli	13??–13??	Son of ʿAli SabiradDīn Maḥamed, accepted the role of vassal and did not continue to rebel against Newaya Krestos, and is subsequently regarded very poorly by Muslim historians
17	Sulṭān Ḥaqquddīn Aḥmed	13??–1374	Son of Aḥmed ʿAli
18	Sulṭān SaʿadadDīn Aḥmed	1374–1403	Son of Aḥmed ʿAli, killed in the Abyssinian invasion of Ifat under Dawit I or Yeshaq I (Note: He was killed either in 805 AH / 1402-3 CE during the reign of Dawit I (according to al-Maqrizi) or in 817 AH / 1414-5 during the reign of Yeshaq I (according to Cerulli, ed. (1931). "History of the Walashmaʿ". R.R.A.L. Ser. vi. Vol. iv. p. 45.) Some historians pick one of the two possible dates (e.g. Paul Henze selects 1403 in Layers of Time, A History of Ethiopia [New York: Palgrave, 2000], p. 67).)

=== Sultans of Adal ===
	Name	Reign	Note
1	Sulṭān SabiradDīn SaʿadadDīn	1415–1422	Son of SaʿadadDīn Aḥmed, He returned to the Horn of Africa from Yemen to reclaim his father's realm. He subsequently became the first ruler and founder of the new Adal dynasty winning many victories before dying of natural causes.
2	Sulṭān Mansur SaʿadadDīn	1422–1424	Son of SaʿadadDīn Aḥmed. He launched an expedition against Dawit I, killing him at the Battle of Yedaya.
3	Sulṭān JamaladDīn SaʿadadDīn	1424–1433	Son of SaʿadadDīn Aḥmed. He won numerous important battles against Yeshaq I before killing him in the battle of Harjah. Famed for piety and justice he was killed by jealous cousins in 1433.
4	Sulṭān Sihab ad-Din Ahmad Badlay "Arwe Badlay"	1433–1445	Son of SaʿadadDīn Aḥmed, also known as "Arwe Badlay" ("Badlay the beast"). Badlay embarked on a full scale conquest of Abyssinia successfully invaded the Ethiopian Empire and capturing Bali before being killed by the forces of Zara Yaqob at the Battle of Gomit. Badlay also founded a new capital at Dakkar, near Harar.
5	Sulṭān Maḥamed AḥmedudDīn	1445–1472	Son of AḥmedudDīn "Badlay" SaʿadadDīn, Maḥamed asked for help from the Mameluk Sultanate of Egypt in 1452, though this assistance was not forthcoming. He ended up signing a very short-lived truce with Baeda Maryam I.
6	Sulṭān ShamsadDin Maḥamed	1472–1488	Son of Maḥamed AḥmedudDīn, he attacked the Emperor Eskender of Abyssinia army in 1479, and slaughtered the majority of his army.
7	Sulṭān Maḥamed ʿAsharadDīn	1488–1518	Great-grandson of SaʿadadDīn Aḥmed of Ifat, he continued to raid the Abyssinians especially during Lent with Mahfuz enslaving innumerable numbers of Abyssinians and Killing King Na’od. He was assassinated after a failed campaign in 1518
8	Sultan Maḥamed Abūbakar Maḥfūẓ	1518–1519	Very popular leader who attempted to recapture Fatagar
9	Sulṭān Abūbakar Maḥamed	1518–1526	He killed Garād Abūn and restored the Walashma dynasty, but Garād Abūn's cousin Imām Aḥmed Gurēy avenged his cousin's death and killed him. While Garād Abūn ruled in Dakkar, Abūbakar Maḥamed established himself at Harar in 1520, and this is often cited as when the capital moved. Abūbakar Maḥamed was the last Walashma sultan to have any real power.
10	Garad Abogn ibn Adish	1519–1525	Successor to Maḥamed Abūbakar Maḥfūẓ
11	Sulṭān ʿUmarDīn Maḥamed	1526–1553	Son of Maḥamed ʿAsharadDīn, Imām Aḥmed Gurēy put Maḥamed ʿAsharadDīn's young son ʿUmarDīn on the throne as puppet king in Imām Aḥmed Gurēy's capital at Harar. This essentially is the end of the Walashma dynasty as a ruling dynasty in all but name, though the dynasty hobbled on in a de jure capacity. Many king lists don't even bother with Walashma rulers after this and just list Imām Aḥmed Gurēy and then Amīr Nūr Mujahid.
12	Sulṭān ʿAli ʿUmarDīn	1553–1555	Son of ʿUmarDīn Maḥamed
13	Sulṭān Barakat ʿUmarDīn	1555–1559	Son of ʿUmarDīn Maḥamed, last of the Walashma Sultans, assisted Amīr Nūr Mujahid in his attempt to retake Dawaro. He was killed defending Harar from Emperor Gelawdewos' forces, ending the dynasty.

== Genealogical traditions ==
The Walashma princes of Ifat and Adal claimed to possess Arab genealogical traditions. In terms of lineage, they were said to be of Quraysh origin, and according to Didier Morin, an ethnically Arab dynasty.The local semi-legendary apologetic "History of the Walasma" asserts that ʿUmar ibn-Dunya-hawaz was a descendant of Caliph ʿAlī's son al-Hasan. The Egyptian historian al-Maqrizi states that dynasty was descended either from the Banu Hashim via Aqil ibn Abi Talib or Banu Abd al-Dar. Although, as Italian scholar Enrico Cerulli points out, native Muslim rulers in southern Ethiopia often exaggerated their genealogical ties to prominent Arab tribes in order to legitimise their authority and strengthen their political and religious standing. According to David D. Laitin and Said Sheikh Samatar, the Walashma claimed a fictive descent linking them to noble Arab figures. Across the Islamic world, Arab genealogies were produced for the purpose of social prestige and position. It was for this reason that the Walashma created an Arab connection for themselves that placed them in proximity to revered religious figures.

Historians such as Enrico Cerulli and J. Spencer Trimingham regard the Walashma dynasty to be of local origin. Taddese Tamrat notes that according to al-Maqrizi, the ancestors of the Walashma were initially established in Jabarta, a region of Zeila, before gradually moving further inland towards Ifat. Cerulli asserts that according to Harar chronicles, the 10th century Somali saint "Aw" Barkhadle from Arabia was the fifth ancestor ofʿUmar ibn Dunya-hawaz, founder of the Walashma Dynasty. Ioan Lewis also mentions that in a short king-list titled 'Rulers of the land of Sa'ad ad-Din', Barkhadle is recognized as one of the Walashma ancestors. Lewis places his death at around 1190 AD. J. Spencer Trimingham does note that according to local traditions though, he was said to have lived for over 500 years, placing his death in the early 16th century. According to Morin, Barkhadle is associated with the Isaaq. Some rulers of the Walashma Dynasty are also thought to be buried at the site of Aw-Barkhadle in modern-day Somaliland. As descendants of Barkhadle, it was said that the Walashma success, longevity, and influence was due to their native family background Walasma are historically tied to the ancestors of Argobba and the people of Doba. The Harari people also claim to be associated with the Walasma. Bahru Zewde, Richard Pankhurst, Djibril Niane regard the Walasma Sultans of Ifat and Adal to be predominantly Argobba and Harari. However, Amelie Chekroun suggests no possible link to identify the people of medieval Ifat with the Argobba people.

Walasma dynasty of Ifat initiated a series of marriage alliances with the leaders of Adal. Ferry Robert notes that there existed political and matrimonial relations between the nobles of Adal and Somali tribes. According to the chronicle "Conquest of Abyssinia" by Arab Faqīh, Harla lords descendant from the last Walasma ruler of Ifat Sa'ad ad-Din II participated in the sixteenth century Ethiopian–Adal War. The last known Walasma member in Adal was Barakat ibn Umar Din of Harar during the sixteenth century. The Kabirto of Harla as well as Doba who originate from the Walasma dynasty were overthrown in 1769 by the Mudaito dynasty of Afar in Aussa (modern Afar Region), the descendant of Kabirto Shaykh Kabir Hamza, preserved their history through manuscripts.

The title Walasma was still used in Ifat province as late as the nineteenth century with governors of that region claiming descent from the old dynasty. In 1993 Mohammed Saleh who professed his ancestors were the Argobba Walasma of Ifat revealed that his progenitors were traders of the Shewa-Harar route for centuries.

== Language ==
According to Ferry Robert, the language spoken by the people of Adal as well as its rulers the Imams and Sultans would closely resemble contemporary Harari language. The 19th-century Ethiopian historian Asma Giyorgis suggests that the Walashma themselves spoke Arabic.

== Family tree ==
Walashma dynasty

Sultanate of Ifat
Umar Walashma r. 1185–1228
Ali Umar r. 1228–12??	Haqq al-Din Umar r. 12??–12??	Husayn Umar r. 12??–12??	Nasr al-Din Umar r. 12??–12??	Mansur Umar
Jamal al-Din Ali r. 12??–12??	Mansur Ali r. 12??–12??	Nahwi Mansur
Abud Jamal al-Din r. 1228–12??	Haqq al-Din I Nahwi r. 13??–1328	Sabr al-Din I Nahwi r. 1328–1332	Jamal al-Din I Nahwi r. 1332–13??	Nasr al-Din Nahwi r. 13??–13??
Zubayr Abud r. 12??–13??	Layla Abud r. 13??–13??	Ali Sabr al-Din r. 13??–13??
Ahmad Ali r. 13??–13??
Haqq al-Din II Ahmad r. 13??–1386/7	Sa'ad al-Din II Ahmad r. 1386/7–1402/3
Sultanate of Adal
Sabr al-Din III; Sa'ad al-Din r. 1415–1422/3	Mansur Sa'ad al-Din r. 1422/3–1424	Jamal al-Din II; Sa'ad al-Din r. 1424–1433	Badlay Sa'ad ad-Din r. 1433–1445	Abu Bakr Sa'ad al-Din
Muhammad Badlay r. 1445–1472	Azhar Abu Bakr
Shams al-Din; Muhammad r. 1472–1488	Muhammad Azhar r. 1488–1518
Abu Bakr; Muhammad r. 1525–1526	Umar al-Din; Muhammad r. 1526–1553
Ali Umar al-Din r. 1553–1555	Barakat Umar al-Din r. 1555–1559

== See also ==
- Somali aristocratic and court titles
- Ethiopian aristocratic and court titles
