= Mora (historical region) =

Historic state in modern Ethiopia

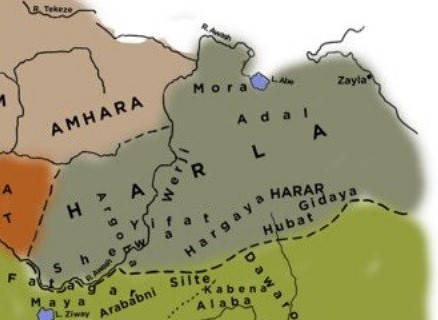
Location of Mora state in the middle ages

Mora (Harari: ሞረ Morä) also known as Mūra was a historical Muslim state located in the Horn of Africa. It was positioned in Sitti northward of Ifat within reach of Aussa city in modern Afar region of Ethiopia. Mora neighbored other states in the medieval era including Adal, Hubat, Hargaya, Gidaya, Hadiya, and Fatagar.

== History ==
In 1264 Sultan Dil Gamis of Makhzumi defeated the overlord of Mora state in battle. Following Walasma deposing the Makhzumi dynasty in 1285, Mora was incorporated into the Ifat Sultanate circa 1288.

In the fourteenth century Mora was among the states referenced by an Abyssinian emperor for raids conducted in his realm purely to capture slaves. During Abyssinian Emperor Amda Seyon's invasion of the Ifat Sultanate in the fourteenth century, Mora joined a coalition with Adal and elected Imam Salih as their leader. The so-called Amda Seyon chronicle states that the people of Mora had the ability to prophesize weather conditions. According to Ulrich Braukämper, in the following centuries Mora seems to have been incorporated into Adal.
