= Haqq ad-Din I =

Haqq ad-Din حق الدين
- Emir of the Sultanate of Ifat
- Reign: starting 1328
Names
- Haqq ad-Din I
- Dynasty: Walashma dynasty
- Religion: Islam

Haqq ad-Din I (Arabic: حق الدين) (flourished 1328) was a sultan of the Ifat Sultanate and the son of Nahwi b. Mansur b. Umar Walashma. According to I.M. Lewis, Emir Haqq "turned the sporadic and disjointed forays of his predecessors into a full-scale war of aggression, and apparently for the first time, couched his call to arms in the form of a religious war against the Abyssinian 'infidel'". According to the American University and Irving Kaplan, Haqq ad-Din was an ethnic Somali ruler.

== Reign ==
Haqq ad-Din I was encouraged by Sultan Al-Nasir Muhammad of Egypt to attack Ethiopia. Emir Haqq captured an envoy of the Emperor of Ethiopia, Amda Seyon, returning from Cairo, whom he attempted to forcibly convert to Islam, and when this failed killed the man.

The news of this outrage so angered the Emperor that he immediately rode off to Ifat with only seven other horsemen. The chronicler claims that once he arrived there, the Emperor slaughtered large numbers of Haqq ad-Din's men, and when a part of Amda Seyon's army caught up with them, they sacked the capital of Ifat and hauled away a considerable amount of gold, silver, bronze and lead, as well as considerable garments.

He was later killed in battle by Emperor Amda Seyon in 1328.

== See also ==
- Haqq ad-Din II
- Walashma dynasty

== Notes ==
Preceded by Ali ibn Wali Asma	Walashma dynasty	Succeeded by Sabr ad-Din I
