= George Wynn Brereton Huntingford =

English linguist, anthropologist and historian

George Wynn Brereton Huntingford (19 November 1901 – 19 February 1978) was an English linguist, anthropologist and historian. He lectured in East African languages and cultures at SOAS, University of London from 1950 until 1966. In 1966, Huntingford went to Canada to organise the Department of Anthropology at the University of New Brunswick at Fredericton, and retired to Málaga the next year, where he lived after his retirement.

== Bibliography ==
- Huntingford, George Wynn Brereton (1989). The Historical Geography of Ethiopia: From the First Century Ad to 1704. British Academy. ISBN 978-0-19-726055-5.
- The Northern Nilo-Hamites (1953)
- The Southern Nilo- Hamites (1953)
- The Galla of Ethiopia (1955)
- Correspondence, seminar papers and reports relating to the history, languages and culture of the peoples of East Africa, collected by G.W.B. Huntingford are held by SOAS Archives
