= Mohammed Hassen =

Ethiopian historian

Mohammed Hassen Ali
- Born: Garamuelta, Hararghe, Ethiopia

Academic background
- Education: University of London; Addis Ababa University
- Thesis: The Oromo of Ethiopia, 1500-1850 (1983)

Academic work
- Discipline: African studies; history
- Sub-discipline: Ethiopian history; Ethiopian studies
- Institutions: Georgia State University

Mohammed Hassen Ali is an Ethiopian historian and a scholar of Ethiopian studies.

== Early life and education ==
Mohammed Hassen was born in Hararghe, Ethiopia to Oromo farmers. He spent his early years in the city of Harar. Mohammed received his BA at the Addis Ababa University in Ethiopia and his PhD in African history at the University of London in the United Kingdom.

== Career ==
He is currently assistant professor of the Middle East Studies Center at Georgia State University in the United States.

In 2023 he was one of the arbitrators between Oromo Liberation Army rebels and the Ethiopian government.
