= Greek Aljamiado =

Greek written with the Arabic script

Greek Aljamiado refers to a tradition that existed prior to the 20th century of writing Greek language in the Arabic script. The term Aljamiado is a borrowing from Romance languages such as Spanish, for which a similar tradition existed. Although less widespread and less studied than these counterparts, Greek Aljamiado has a long and diverse tradition as well, as far back as the 13th century, with poems written by Jalal al-Din Rumi and his son Sultan Walad in Greek but in Arabic script.

This tradition existed among some Greek Muslims from Crete as well as Epirote Muslims in Ioannina who wrote their Cretan Greek in the Arabic alphabet. It also existed among Arab Melkite Christians in the Levant (Syria, Lebanon, and Palestine) for writing of liturgical texts.

The inverse of this tradition existed among Greek orthodox Christian Karamanlides, who use the Greek alphabet for writing of their Turkish dialect.

== History ==
The oldest known instances of Greek Aljamiado are from the 13th century, and go back to the poem collections of Jalal al-Din Rumi and his son Sultan Walad. Rumi wrote almost exclusively in Persian, only including a few Turkish and Greek verses in some of his poems. On the other hand, alongside Persian, Sultan Walad also wrote more poems in Turkish, and also more Greek poems. The works of Rumi and Sultan Walad appear to reflect the colloquial dialect of Cappadocia at the time. The colloquial nature of the text as well as the fact that vowels in the Arabic alphabet at the time, were written sporadically and irregularly. This makes modern understanding of these poems very difficult to understand and requiring a dialectological analysis.

Below is a sample ghazal poem by Sultan Walad, a typical theme within the framework of Sufi literature, in praise of God.

Original text

افندی آپو كرذیا بنده ثیلو
- تثیرو سو تخوما نادفیلو
دی ذتذریمی اغو نكسفره توتو
- ابتریمو یسینا نیدو فیلو
اٰسی فیلس امینا یاتی زویتی
- اغو ایسینا افندی دنسی فیلو
اكینون بومسس ایسی نمیسو
- اكینون بو تو ثیلس نیمی فیلو
شلیاذس ایشیشاش خوما ایینان
- یشیلی بوفتسن ستوسون تو شیلو
ستو میدان ستفلیا بندو فایا
- ابیتا شریسو بفتو كیكیلو
اغا بیسو بیینی یون بتامی
- كغو ییریزو میسا یندو میلو
اكزمس ثیلمی كغو اففغو
- كسی فغیس كغو ایسینا ثیلو
تو بوریكو تبكرو دستا آلس
- امینا دوس اسی اغلیكی میلو
ككس انكاثینی ككلی پندا
- امینا پیسمی آثی نیلو
ولد لاستو مولانا تثریا
- ایغو ثورو ثلاسا كالی بیلو

Transciption into Modern Greek

Αφέντη, από καρδιά πάντα θέλω,
του θυρού σου το χώμα ναν το φιλώ·
τι δεντρί 'μαι εγώ, να 'ξευρα τούτο,
όπου τρέμω για σέναν γοιον το φύλλο.
Εσύ φιλείς εμένα για τη ζωή <τού>τη·
εγώ εσένα αφέντη δεν σε φιλώ.
Εκείνον που μισείς εσύ να μισώ·
εκείνον που το θέλεις να μη φιλώ.
Χιλιάδες οι ψυχές, χώμα έγιναν·
οι χίλιοι π<ρ>όφτασαν στο σον το χείλο.
Στο μεϊντάνι σταφύλια παντού φαγιά
απέ τα χέρια σου πέφτου και κυλού.
Αγάπη σου πηγαίνει γοιον ποτάμι
κ' εγώ γυρίζω μέσα γοιον το μύλο.
Ο κόσμος θέλει με κ' εγώ εφεύγω·
και συ φεύγεις κ' εγώ εσένα θέλω.
Το πωρικό το πικρό δώσ' το άλλους·
εμένα δώσε συ εγλυκύ μήλο.
Κακός αγκάθι 'ναι και κλαίει πάντα·
εμένα ποίσε με άθι να γελώ.
Βαλέντ λα<λά> στου Μαυλανά τα θύρια·
εγώ θωρώ θάλασσα κι άλλοι πηλό.

English translation

Master, from my heart I always want
to kiss the ground at your door.
What kind of a tree am I, I'd like to know,
to tremble for you like a leaf.
You kiss me for [throughout] this life;
I do not kiss you, master.
Whom you hate, I will hate.
Whom you desire, I will not kiss.
There are thousands of souls, they have become dust.
The thousand managed to get to your lips.
In the square, grapes, food everywhere
fall and flow from your hands.
Your love goes forth like a river,
and I turn in it like a mill.
The world wants me, and I am leaving.
You are leaving too, and I want you.
Give the bitter fruit to others,
to me, give a sweet apple.
A bad man is a thorn, and always cries.
Make me a flower, so I can laugh.
Walad speaks at Mevlana's doors:
I see the sea, and others see mud.

During the 14th century, the most prominent work to be produced presenting Greek Aljamiado, was the Rasulid Hexaglot, written or prepared for Al-Afdal al-Abbas, the king of Yemen from the Rasulid dynasty.

During the 15th and 16th centuries, there are a few texts available, including ghazal couplets by the Ottoman poet Ahmed Pasha between 1453 and 1466, as well as the two versions of the Arabic-Persian-Greek-Serbian Conversation Textbook written at the end of the 15th century. The Greek section has been determined to have influences from the Pontic and Chios dialects.

Below is a sample of the ghazal poems by Ahmed Pasha:

Original text

اله نا فیلسمه پرذقمو
- اله نا میرسومه ڤسلقمو

Transciption into Modern Greek

έλα να φιλησ[τ]ούμε πέρδικά μου
έλα να μυρισ[τ]ούμε βασιλικιά μου

English translation

Come, let's kiss, my partridge;
Come, let's smell each other, my queen.

The two versions of the Arabic-Persian-Greek-Serbian Conversation Textbook are noteworthy in that they systematically mark all vowels in a consistent way, even distinguishing between vowels such as ο and ου. Below is the Arabic text as well as the Greek corresponding text for the first page of the two versions.

Mss. Ayasofya 4749	Mss. Ayasofya 4750
بِسْمِ ٱللَّهِ ٱلرَّحمَـٰنِ ٱلرَّحِيمِ اَنْ دُوا اوُانُوامَاتِ تُثَاوُ تُوپُوالِيأَلٰۤاءُ تُواَلَئٖيمُوانُواسْ Εντο ονοματι του Θεου του πολιελέυ του ελεημονος In the name of God, the most compassionate, the most merciful ٱلْحَمْدُ لِلَّهِ رَبِّ ٱلْعَالَمِينَ اوُا اَۤنُواسْ تُوثَأوُ تُواكِيرٖيأُوا تُوانْ قْتٖيسَاُوانْ Ω ενος το Θέου το κυριο των κτησεων Praise be to God, Lord of the worlds. وَٱلصَّلَوَةُ عَلَى رَسُولِهِ مُحَمَّدٍ وَاَۤلِهِ كَاِي اَفْڅٖي اَپٖي تُوااَۤپُواسْتُوالُوا اَۤفْتُو مُوااَۤمَثْ كَتُوااِيقُوا اَۤفْتُو Καί ή ευχη επι του αποστολο αύτό Μωάμεθ και το οικειο αυτο Blessings be upon His Messenger Muhammad and his progeny ٱلطَّاهِرٖينَ اَجْمَعٖينَ قَالَ مُصَنِّفُ تُواقَاثَارُوا پَانْدٖي اِيپَنْ اُواپِيئِيتٖسْ το καθαρο παντί, είπεν ο ποιητής who are pure, all of them; said the author.	بِسْمِ ٱللَّهِ ٱلرَّحمَـٰنِ ٱلرَّحِيمِ اِسْتُوا اوُانُوامَا تُوثَاوُ تُوپُوالِاَلٰۤاءُ تُواَلَئٖيمُوانُواسْ Στο ονομα του Θεου του πολιελέυ του ελεημονος In the name of God, the most compassionate, the most merciful ٱلْحَمْدُ لِلَّهِ رَبِّ ٱلْعَالَمِينَ اوُا اَۤنُواسْ تُوثَاوُ تُواكِيرٖيؤُوا تُوانْ قْتٖيسَأُوانْ Ω ενος το Θέου το κυριο των κτησεων Praise be to God, Lord of the worlds. وَٱلصَّلَوَةُ عَلَى رَسُولِهِ كَاِي اَفْڅٖي اَپٖي تُوااَۤپُواسْتُوالُوا اَۤفْتُو Καί ή ευχη επι του αποστολο αύτό Blessings be upon His Messenger مُحَمَّدٍ وَاَۤلِهِ ٱلطَّاهِرٖينَ اَجْمَعٖينَ مُوااَۤمَثْ كَتُوااِيقُوا اَۤفْتُو تُواقَاثَارُوا پَانْدٖي Μωάμεθ και το οικειο αυτο το καθαρο παντί. Muhammad, and his pure progeny, all of them

In the following centuries, many more Greek Aljamiado literary works were produced. These include catechisms, Greek translation of famous Islamic texts, and Islamic poems from Grecophone Muslims of Epirus, personal items, language materials, word lists, and rhyming dictionaries, political poetry, as well as religious texts from Cretan Muslims.

In parallel, this era saw the rise of Christian religious texts as well, in Greek Aljamiado. Arabic speaking Christians belonging to the Byzantine rite from the Levant (Lebanon, Palestine, and Syria) produced many liturgical items in this medium.

Below is a sample text from a bilingual Arabic-Greek document dated to the 19th century, containing Christian prayers and liturgical texts, Arabic followed by Greek in Aljamiado and Greek alphabet, followed by English. This is the prayer that is to be said before receiving the Eucharist.

ابارك الرب في كل وقت وفي كل حين تسبحهُ بفمي. الخبزَ السماويَ والكاسَ الحيوة. ذوقوا وانظروا ما اطيب الرب.
اەڤلوچيصُوطون كيريون. اەن بانديكەرو زيابانضوس ايانەسيس. آفطو اەنضوسطوماتيمُو. آريطون اورانيون كەبوتيريون. زواىِٕيس. چە فصاستەكە ايذەتە اوتي خريستوس اوكيريوس. الليلويا.

Εὐλογήσω τὸν Κύριον ἐν παντὶ καιρῷ, διὰ παντὸς ἡ αἴνεσις αὐτοῦ ἐν τῷ στόματί μου. ἄρτον ουράνιών καὶ ποτήριον ζωής. γεύσασθε καὶ ἴδετε ὅτι χρηστὸς ὁ κύριος· Αλληλούια.
I will bless the LORD at all times: his praise shall continually be in my mouth. Bread of Heaven and cup of life; taste and see that the Lord is good. Hallelujah!

The Greek Aljamiado texts among Greek-speaking Muslims living alongside Turkish speaking citizens and interacting with them, tended to have its commonly used orthographic patterns and conventions as well as the letters used, converge towards Ottoman Turkish, whereas the texts written by Arabic speaking Christians of the Levant tended to converge towards Arabic orthographic standards.

== Orthography ==
Greek Aljamiado, being a syncretistic parallel script developed for use of unique minority communities, generally didn't developt a standardized orthographic or spelling convention. Every author writes in a way that reflects his personal perception of the phonetic structure of his local dialect of Greek. Nevertheless, some general trends and conventions were developed, especially from the 17th century onward with an increase in the practice of writing Greek in the Arabic script. Furthermore, the existing spelling conventions in existence in Ottoman Turkish among Greek-speaking Muslim communities (or Levantine Arabic among Arabic-speaking Christians) directly influenced the authors' orthographic convention.

The first notable feature that is to be addressed, is the vowel notation that has been employed for Greek Aljamiado. Arabic script, when used for writing of Arabic, distinguishes between 3 pairs of long and short vowels [a] / [aː], [u] / [uː], and [i] / [iː]. Short vowels are written with three vowel diacritics, or in most cases, not written at all, whereas long vowels are shown with one of the three matres lectionis letters, ʾalif ا, wāw و, hāʾ ـه ه, and yāʾ ي. This distinction has been transferred to Persian language as well, matching its vowel system consisting of 6-8 vowels depending on dialect. Such distinction does not exist in Turkish. Thus, vowel notations in Ottoman orthography were highly fluctuating, with no way of establishing a pattern. Ottoman Turkish used a mixed system that has matured and has been accepted over centuries of usage, where a hybrid system of diacritics (or leaving vowels unwritten) and letter notation was used. Similarly, Greek vowels did not distinguish between short and long, and thus Greek Aljamiado had the same issues and shortcomings as Ottoman orthography.

Generally, older texts, such as those by Jalal al-Din Rumi and Sultan Walad in the 13th century, use a mixed system of leaving vowels out or using the three letters; later texts from 15th to 18th century write vowels more often, either with diacritics or with the three letters; some of the most recent texts, and in general, documents of linguistic significance, such as Kelimāt-i türkiyye ve rūmiyye (lexicon of Turkish and Greek)(1874), Turkish-Greek Istanbul dialogue book (1876), or the Arabic-Persian-Greek-Serbian Conversation Textbook, each have a systematic way of using letters to fully write all vowels.

Earlier, prior to the 19th century, there existed a practice, going as far back as Sultan Walad in the 13th century, the distinction between vowel lengths in Arabic was transformed and superimposed onto Greek in form of distinction between stressed and unstressed vowels. (A similar practice exists in other adaptations of the Arabic script, such as Swahili Ajami) This distinction was probably triggered by Persian poetry metrical schemes.

Another feature of Greek Aljamiado is the representation of allophones with different letters when they are not distinguished in Greek alphabet. For example, the letter κ is pronounced as [k] before vowels [a], [o], and [u]; and as [c] before vowels [e], [i]; the former being written with qāf ق, the latter with kāf ك.

Phonological writing, as opposed to a one-to-one transliteration, is a common occurrence as well. For example, the letter σ ς, is usually written with a letter sīn س, but before voiced consonants, where it is pronounced as [z], the letter zāy ز is used instead. With respect to digraphs ντ and μπ, in which the pronunciation of the second letter becomes voiced [d] and [b] respectively, is represented accordingly in Greek Aljamiado.

Generally speaking, the older texts (13th to 15th centuries) use a more phonetic writing, while morphological writing becomes more frequent (but by no means exclusive) in the later centuries.

As for the choice of consonants, all available documents from Greek-speaking communities generally use the same set of consonants that exist in Ottoman Turkish alphabet, characters such as پ pe for π [p] and ڭ kāf-ı nūnī for digraphs γγ γκ [ŋ]. Additionally, some documents use the letter ڤ ve to represent the letter β [v]. (Although, some later documents use the letter و). Furthermore, universally, in all documents, the letters ث se and ذ zel are used as well, but representing phonemes [θ] and [ð] respectively as they're used in Arabic, and not [s] and [z] as in Ottoman Turkish and Persian. These two letters represent the letters θ and δ respectively. In a few of the language material books and older documents, two additional letters are observed as well; The letter څ for the platal allophone of the letter χ, [ç], contrasted with the velar pronunciation of the letter χ, [x], written with خ; and the letter ڃ in the Arabic-Persian-Greek-Serbian Conversation Textbook, for the digraph [ts].

As can be seen in the example above, the Christian liturgical document produced by Arabic-speaking Christian communities of the Levant do not follow the Ottoman Turkish standard, instead following a standard more familiar to native Arabic speakers. For example, the letter پ pe isn't used. Or, the letter چ is used for representing the sound [g], based on the perception that there exists Arabic dialects in the region where the letter ج je is pronounced as [g], and thus it makes more sense for a unique letter representing this sound to be derived from the letter ج je.

The sound [t] also had fluctuations in representation in Greek Aljamiado, using either ت or ط, same as in Ottoman Turkish. In Ottoman Turkish, the choice of these two letters were standardized, with the former being adjacent to front vowels and the latter adjactent to back vowels. In Greek Aljamiado, although not universally, this was transformed into the letter ت being used before "platal" vowels [i] and [e], and the letter ط before "velar" vowels, [a], [o], [u].
