= Ashrafiya Mosque =

Mosque in Taiz, Yemen

Madrasa and Mosque of Al-Ashrafiya جامع ومدرسة الأشرفية
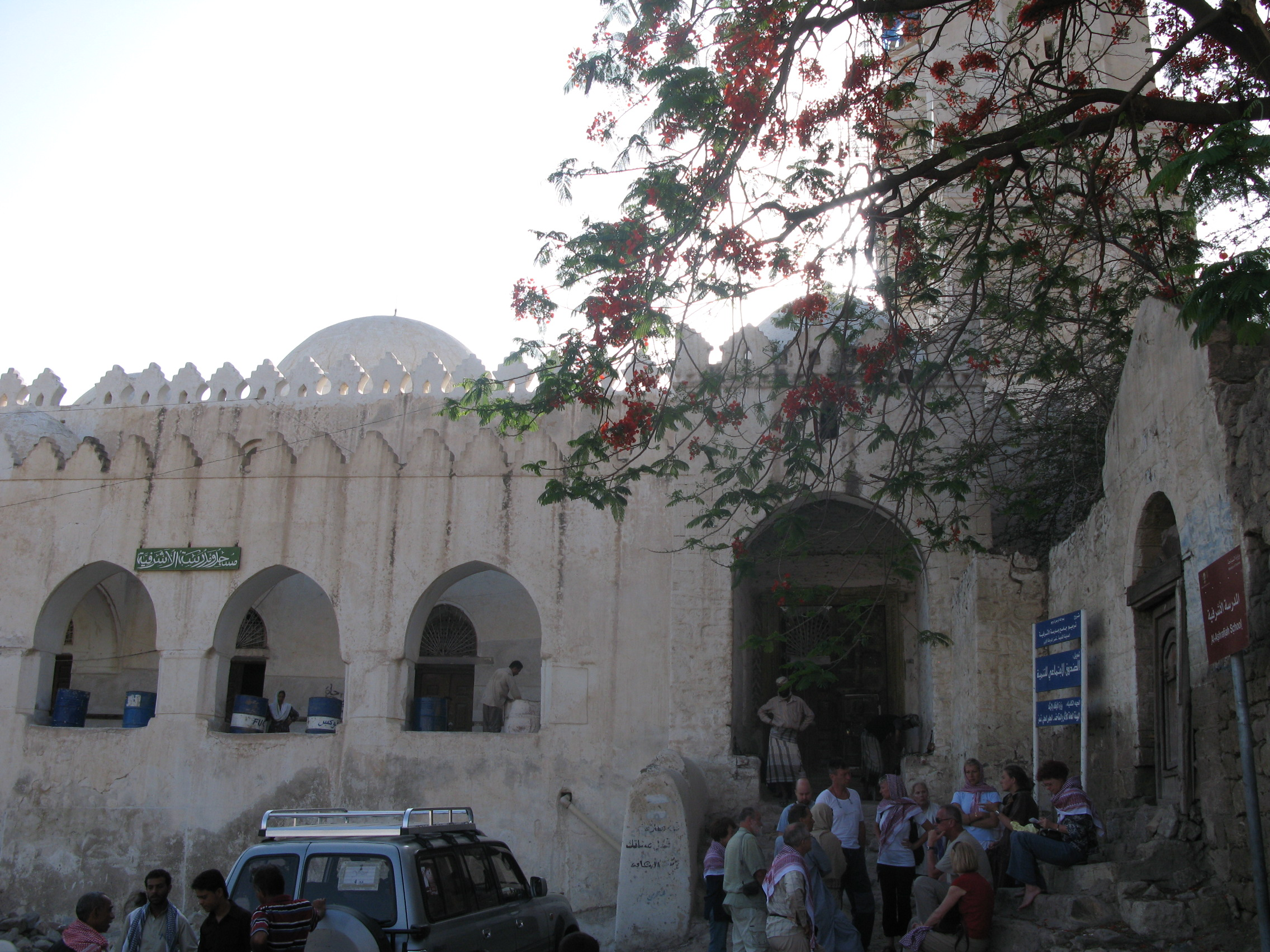

Religion
- Affiliation: Islam
- Region: West Asia
- Status: Active

Location
- Location: Taiz, Yemen
- Interactive map of Madrasa and Mosque of Al-Ashrafiya جامع ومدرسة الأشرفية
- Coordinates: 13°34′08″N 44°00′32″E

Architecture
- Type: Mosque, Madrasa
- Style: Islamic architecture
- Completed: 1275; 2004-2015 (restoration)

Specifications
- Dome: 9
- Minaret: 2
- Materials: stone, gypsum, plaster

Madrasa and Mosque of Al-Ashrafiya or Al-Ashrafiya Mosque (Arabic: جامع ومدرسة الأشرفية) is a historical madrasa-mosque located in the old city of Taiz, Yemen at the foot of Mount Sabr in the southwestern part of the city. It is arguably the most notable preserved artifact of Taiz, given its distinct and beautiful design. It is considered to be one of the most important centers in the Islamic history of Yemen along with its complement, the Mudhaffar Mosque. It was supposedly built in two stages: (1) by Sultan Al-Ashraf Umar II (1295-6) or 800 Hijri, (2) by Sultan Al-Ashraf Isma'il I (1377-1400) and opened in 1382 or 803 Hijri. This compound can be found in the neighborhood of Ashrafiya, surrounded by a number of other locations and overlooks the Cairo Citadel. The mosque accommodates approximately 120 to 800 worshippers.

== Architecture ==
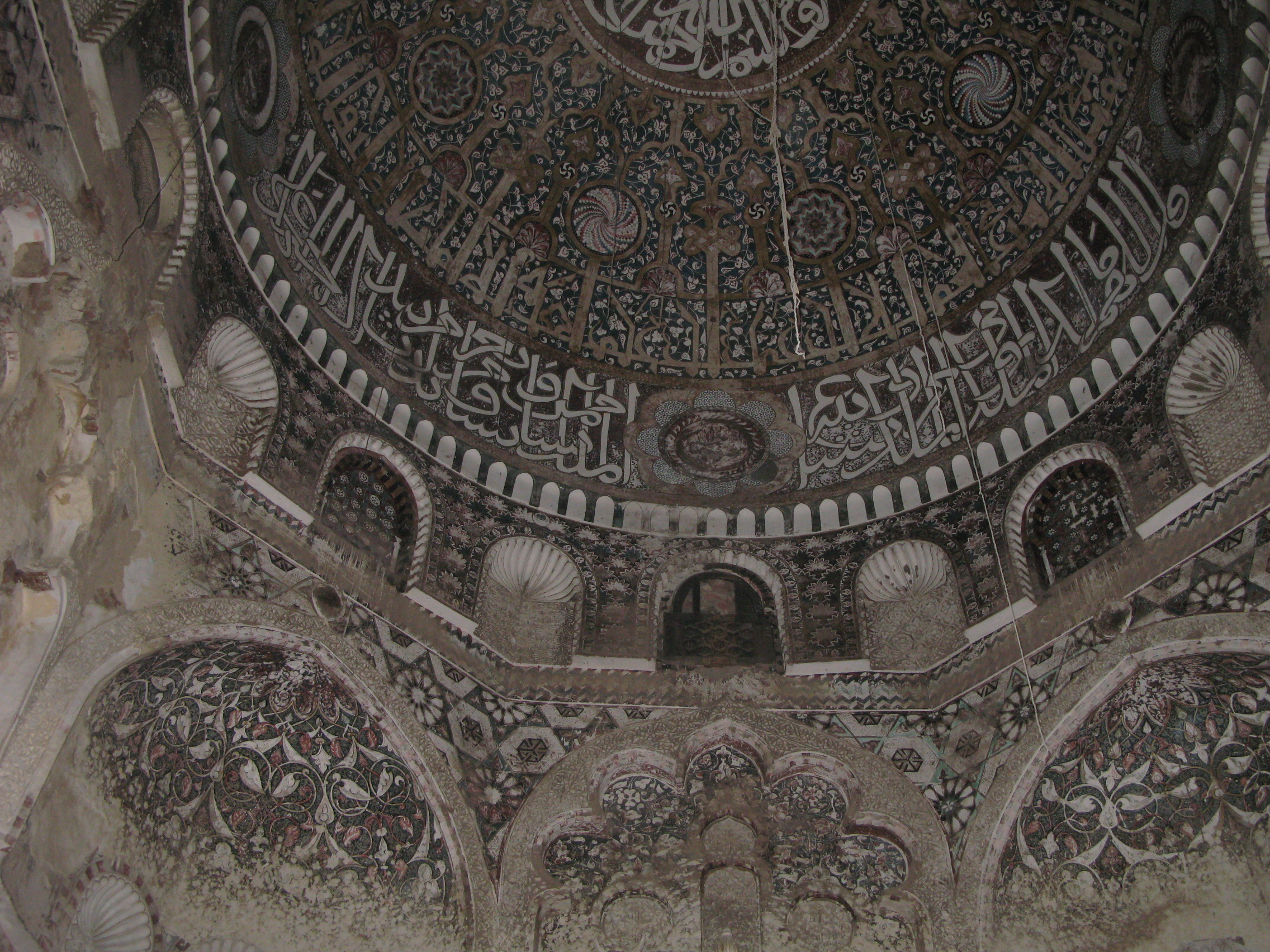
Inner view of the dome of Ashrafiyah mosque, covered with floral motifs, geometric patterns and religious inscriptions.

The material used in the mosque's construction is qadad, it is made of a lime plaster treated with slaked lime, oils and water. Since the mosque was built on top of storm drains, every part of the structure built above the foundation is made of red brick. Located in the northern part of the compound, the prayer room is the main space of this mosque. It forms a large rectangular area that spans approximately 25.40 meters east to west and is 7.65 meters wide from north to south.

The center of the mosque is sheltered by a large dome decorated with colorful motifs. The dome's square is neighbored by two separate hallways, each one covered by four smaller domes. In its earliest model, the mosque consisted of a single prayer hall along with eight smaller domes. In its first stage, the mosque had a prayer hall with eight small domes surrounding a much larger central dome. Also on the premises, a square courtyard can be found behind the main mosque building. A royal tomb chamber and several classrooms for the Quranic school surround the courtyard. Consequently, this creates an almost perfect square of the land plot. The south side of the courtyard contains a pair of non-homogenously designed minarets in the corners of the plot. Although they may appear the same to the naked eye from a distant glance, the minarets actually differ in dimensions and symmetry.

The mosque was decorated in stucco and painted ornament of high sophistication. The decorative program of the mosque is often considered a finer example than that of other mosques in the region. In addition, the qibla wall is decorated to match the exact design concept of the courtyard. It has a succession of adjacent arches with supporting columns, or arcades, that superimpose and get increasingly smaller.

== Madrasa ==
Consistent with the Islamic architectural design of the Arabian Peninsula, domed buildings became very prominent with the architectural design of madrasas like the Ashrafiya Mosque. However, the Ashrafiya Mosque varied from other traditional models in that the library and Quranic school were integral to the structure of the mosque complex. The madrasa was mainly built of raw materials such as stone and plaster that had primarily been sourced locally. It is considered one of the most influential centers of education of the Shafiʽi Islamic school of thought and jurisprudence in the Islamic world. The school has a vast library with books in various subjects to satisfy the studies of the Muslim scholars and students belonging to the institution. Structurally, the madrasa has four accessible entrances. Above the main entrance is an inscription that reads the following:

Order of the building of this blessed school by our lord and king Sultan Al-Sayyid by the terms of the honorable king of the country and the religion Ismail bin Abbas bin Ali bin Dawud bin Yusuf God gave his kingdom and victory.

== Tomb History in Yemen ==
In addition to a functional prayer hall and Islamic school, the mosque compound contains a burial yard where kings from the Rasulid dynasty that ruled Yemen were buried. In Yemen, the concept of tomb architecture as a part of a mosque compound began to emerge in the sixteenth century. This had been, in principle, a popular aspect of mosque planning in other parts of the Muslim world, especially in Saudi Arabia. Two of the holiest sites of the Muslim faith, Masjid al-Haram and Al-Masjid an-Nabawi, located in Mecca and Medina, respectively, contain burial grounds for some of the most notable figures in Islam like the Prophet Muhammed, his family members, and his companions. Previously, in this region of Yemen, tombs and mosques were two separate entities until a dome was placed over the tomb of Murad Pasha in a mosque setting under the rule of the Ottoman Empire.

== Impacts of War ==
Recently, the architectural integrity of this landmark has been compromised by the destruction caused by the Yemeni Civil War. An unexpected artillery shell launched by the Ansar Allah group (Houthis) and the forces of their former ally, Saleh, against the neighborhood of Al-Ashrafiya had caused significant structural damage to the historic mosque and the neighboring communities. In June 2015, severe damage to the mosque was caused when an artillery shell hit the eastern lighthouse. Although the intention was not to damage the minarets, locals have reported that the Houthis were trying to target a house nearby and missed, gravely destroying a piece of historic Yemeni and Muslim culture and society. Before then, Houthi militias had shelled the Ashrafiya Mosque several times, severely damaging the mosque and madrasa site.

The deputy director-general of tourism in the governorate of Taiz was a witness to this particular incident. He detailed that "On Wednesday, June 17th, 2015, at 4:30, the eastern minaret of the historic Al-Ashrafiya Mosque was suddenly bombed." This incident shook the entire area surrounding the mosque and even shattered the windows of the houses neighboring the mosque. Regarding the structural integrity of the mosque itself, the minaret was visibly damaged by the shell in its middle section leaving a widely visible crack. Concerned citizens and activist groups have long called for intervention to protect this mosque as a historical monument. They have even gone on to directly accuse the Houthis of "intentionally damaging the country’s historical ruins and of not respecting the mosque’s sanctity."

The implications of this war go beyond the worries of that period alone. Tourism, mainly for the purpose of visiting the city’s archaeological sites, has quickly decreased and come to a halt. In turn, there has been a recession for artisans of the region as tourist engagement was their primary source of income. Ultimately, the Al-Ashrafiya Mosque and Madrasa did not only serve as a cultural monument and school as its title suggests, but it also held an important role in the economic sector of the community because of its close ties with tourism.

== Restoration and Preservation Status ==
Along with the destruction caused by war and conflict, the mosque faces degradation caused by many other environmental factors such as seismic movements, geological instability, and rooftop water seepage. Consequently, damage by physical and chemical means as well as anthropogenic degradation have been of significant concern to locals and government officials alike.

In the past decade, the project of restoring the Al-Ashrafiya Mosque and Madrasa has been prioritized and made an example for the purpose of rescue and restoration measures and rehabilitation within the Third International Architectural Conservation Conference and Exhibition in Dubai of 2012. The cooperation and participation of local community members throughout various phases of the project have been instrumental in facilitating a smooth and authentic reconstruction of the mosque to its historical origins.

As part of the final phase of the restoration project, the southern and northern walls, eastern domes, and the basement were restored with plaster resurfacing. In the process of preparing a task force, thirteen technicians were trained on documentation and restoration of gypsum motifs. These sessions were constructed and facilitated by a local expert knowledgeable about the specifics of the Islamic art and architecture field in this particular region. Mural paintings and gypsum decorations at the shrines and the open courtyard were chemically cleaned to more than fifty percent of their original state. Also, the central dome of the mosque, along with the wall of the prayer hall, were mechanically cleaned and consolidated up to sixty-five percent of their original state. In order to update the functionality of the structure, electrical wiring was installed throughout all parts of the premises besides the primary prayer hall. In July 2014, restoration efforts on the mosque were considered complete.

== Gallery ==
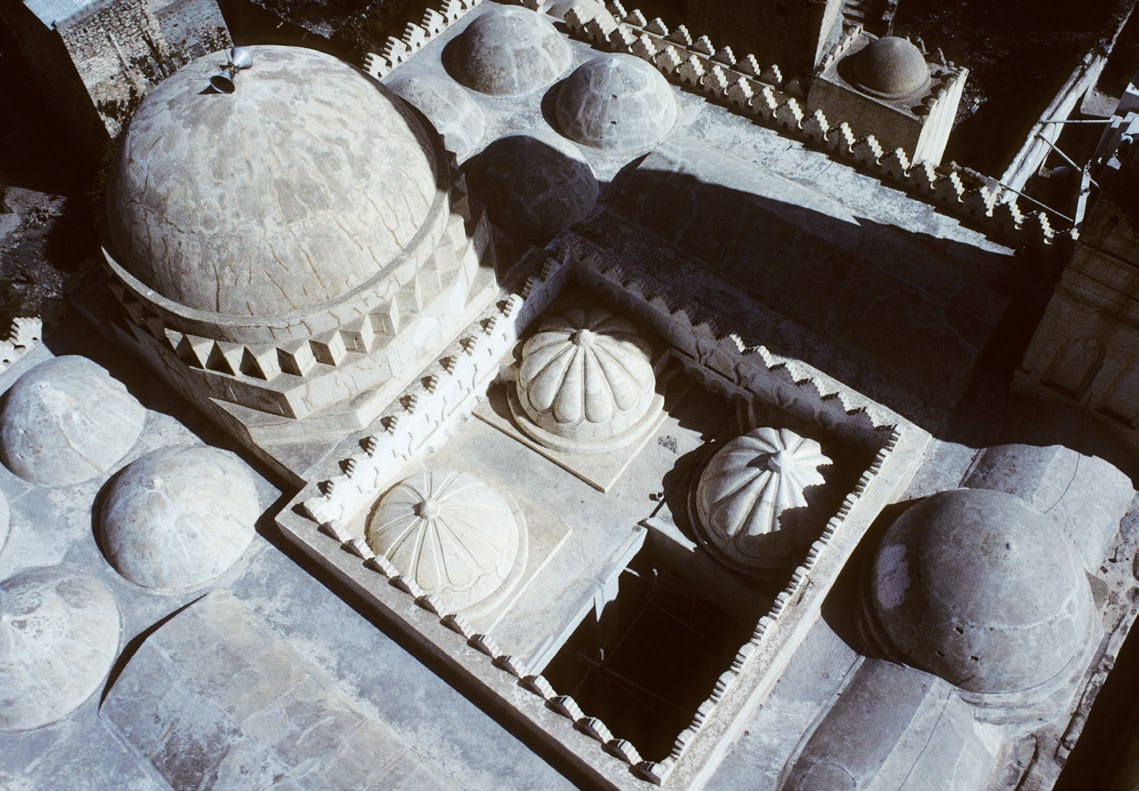
Domes of al-Ashrafiya Mosque.

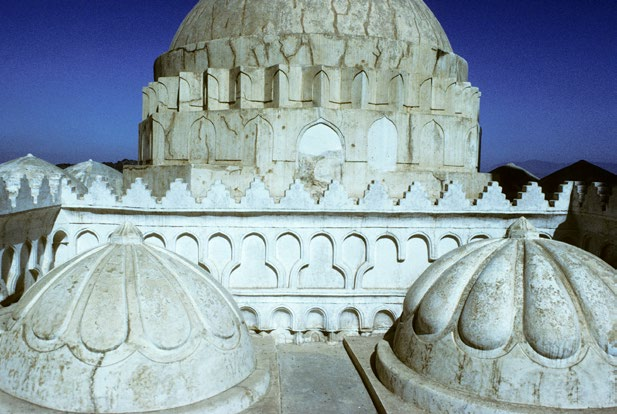
Three of the domes of the Ashrafiya Mosque

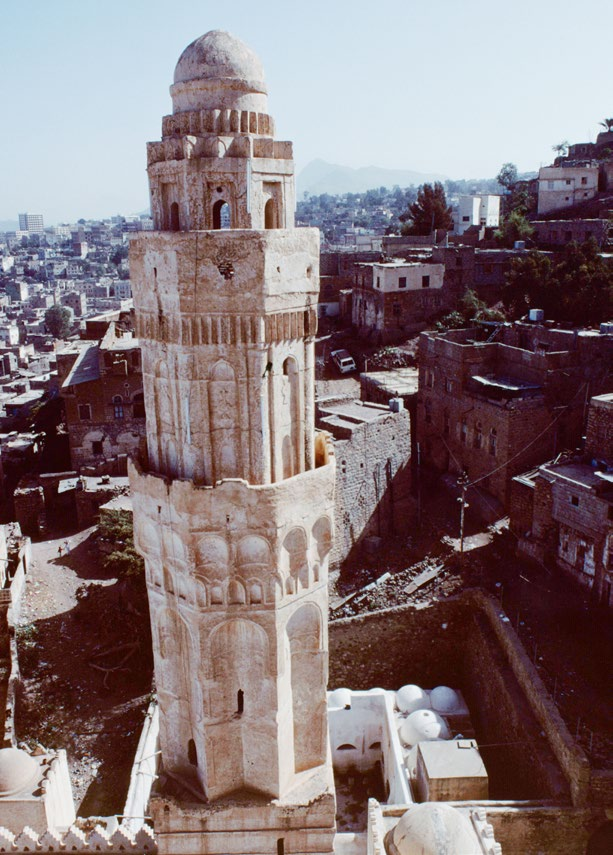
Minaret of the Ashrafiya Mosque

== See also ==
- List of mosques in Yemen
- Late medieval domes
