= Zeila (historical region) =

Historic state in Horn of Africa

Zeila, also known as Zaila or Zayla, was a historical Muslim region in the Horn of Africa. The region was named after the port city of Zeila in modern-day Somaliland. It encompassed territories in what is now modern day eastern Ethiopia and northern Somalia.

== Geography ==
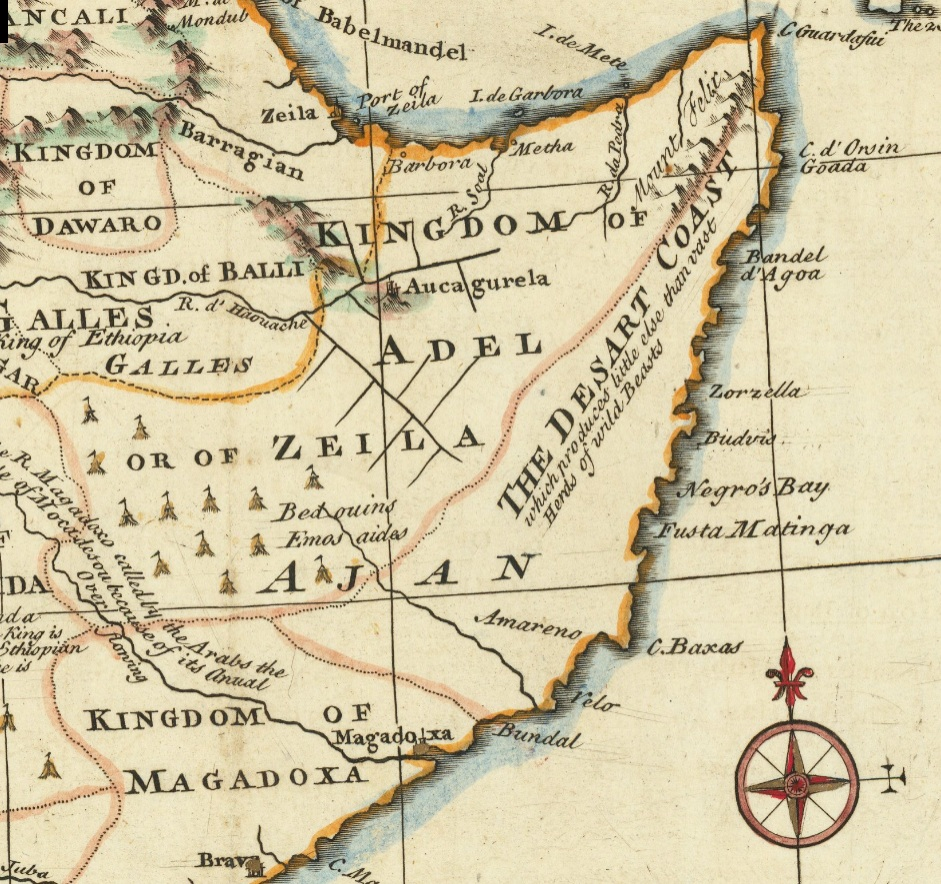
Map of the Zeila region from around 1744, also referred to as the Kingdom of Adal, is situated adjacent to the Oromo (Galla), and Kingdom of Bale to its immediate west, while the Mogadishu lies to the south.

In the medieval Arab world the Muslim inhabited domains in the Horn of Africa were often referred to as Zeila to differentiate them from the Christian territories designated Habasha. In Europe the label Regnvm de Seylam was applied to denote the Muslim realms, appearing on maps such as the 1544 Cosmographia. According to Ibn Battuta, a journey through the whole of Zeila and the Mogadishu region would take eight weeks to complete.

Fourteenth century Arab historian Ibn Fadlallah al-Umari recounted on the usage of the term and its origin being the city of Zeila, a vital port in the region.

this is the region which is called in Egypt and Syria the land of Zaila. This however is only one of their coastal towns and one of their islands, whose name has been extended to the whole

— Ibn Fadlallah al-Umari, Masālik al-abṣār fī Mamālik al-amṣār

The Muslim inhabited territories during this period spanned from the commercial port city of Zeila to a place further inland called Walalah. Ethiopian scholar Taddesse Tamrat noted that according to the Arab historian Al-Maqrizi, Jabarta was also considered part of the region of Zeila.

== History ==
The term Zeila in the thirteenth century was often interchangeable with the Ifat Sultanate which ruled over the entire region and later in the fourteenth century onwards used to denote its successor state the Adal Sultanate as well as Adal region. Throughout this period the attribution "al-Zaylai" frequently signified an individual from this region however it was not made consistently clear whether it referred to the denizens of city specifically or the Muslims further inland.

By the 13th century, the term "Zeila" was often used interchangeably with the Ifat Sultanate, which ruled the region. From the 14th century onward, it referred to its successor state, the Adal Sultanate, as well as the broader Adal region. Throughout this time period, the demonym al-Zayla'i frequently signified an individual from this region, though it was not always clear whether it solely referred to the residents of the city or also included the Muslims in the interior.

Arab writer Ibn al-Mujawir describes Aden's cosmopolitan population as diverse, originating from Alexandria, Cairo, South Arabia, Persia, Turkey, Mogadishu, Zeila, and Al-Hujariah. He noted that these groups had assimilated, contributing greatly to the town's wealth and prosperity, though he identified the Barābir (Somalis) as the majority. Zeila’s distance made shipping water to Aden impractical by the 13th century, leading to the development of the innovative ṣahārij cistern system. Ibn al-Mujawir notes it spurred a major advancement in local water management.

Emerging amid the bustling trade networks linking the region to Yemen, Egypt, and beyond, Islamic scholars who often bore the nisba al-Zayla'i traveled as diplomats, students, and teachers, fostering connections in centers like Cairo and Damascus. Key figures like Abdallah al-Zayla'i, a Hanafi jurist who led an embassy to the Mamluk court, and Fakhr al-Din al-Zayla'i, the author of the authoritative four-volume Tabyīn al-Ḥaqāʾiq, advanced the Hanafi school of Islamic jurisprudence. Abu'l Hasan al-Zayla'i was another highly revered 14th-century Shaykh and jurist whom the famed traveler Ibn Battuta encountered in his Red Sea coastal explorations. Based in Jubla, a quaint highland village near Ta'izz, al-Zayla'i held profound spiritual authority, guiding Hajj pilgrims from Yemen to Makkah, earning him widespread veneration from urban dwellers and Bedouin tribes alike.

In fourteenth century texts, the inhabitants of the Zeila region were stated to be fond of the stimulant khat leaf, which was grown locally. One of the earliest textual references to coffee comes from the Islamic scholar Ibn Hajar al-Haytami, who wrote about its development from a tree in the Zeila region. In 1542, a Portuguese crew captured a ship from Zeila transporting clarified butter and coffee to Al-Shihr. The beverage is believed to have spread from Adal to the Rasulids in the fifteenth century.

Medieval Mamluk historian al-Maqrizi describes Zeila's productive territory Bale:

The length of this kingdom is 20 days, and the breadth is six. This is the most fertile part of the region of Zayla. The inhabitants do not use money, but exchange goods, such as a sheep for an ox, an ox for clothes, & the like. They belong to the Hanefite sect.

However, Islamic scholars from the Zeila region were instrumental in the establishment and spread of different schools of interpretation and application of Islamic law in Yemen, such as the Shafi'i school and the Qadiriyya Sufi order. The Qadari order was so popular in Yemen that one of its scholars, Sharaf al-Din Isma'il al-Jabarti (d. 1403), became a close confidant of the Rasulid ruler Al-Ashraf Isma'il and an administrator in the city of Zabid. Similarly, Ali al-Jabarti (d. 1492) held various administrative and religious posts in Egypt.

According to Rasulid-Yemen records, Zeila had the most prominent commercial port, with its sailors transporting goods to Aden using local vessels, making it one of the primary hubs for mainland trade. Port towns like Berbera and Maydh were also listed as embarkation points in the almanac of Al-Ashraf Umar II.

Fei Xin, a chronicler documenting Zheng He's voyages, highlights Zeila as a key destination during the Ming dynasty's expeditions, with visits occurring between 1413–1415 and 1417–1419.

The fifteenth-century empress Eleni of Ethiopia was styled as "Queen of Zeila" due to her Muslim upbringing and connection to the Hadiya Sultanate. The leaders of Adal were also often referred to as "King of Zeila" in texts, most notably Ahmad ibn Ibrahim al-Ghazi, the conqueror of Abyssinia.

The 1516 account of Duarte Barbosa describes Zeila’s “houses of stone and white-wash, and good streets, the houses are covered with terraces, the dwellers in them are black.” A coeval observer from Europe, the Italian merchant Ludovico di Varthema described Zeila as a bustling trade hub, particularly for gold and ivory. He noted that the people were living extremely well, and that it was governed by a Muslim king who administered justice effectively. The region boasted abundant grain, livestock, oil, honey, and wax, much of which was exported. Varthema also mentioned that many captives from the Ethiopian Empire, referred to as the lands of 'Prester John' passed through Zeila destined for slavery, suggesting ongoing conflicts with the Solomonic dynasty.

Ottoman admiral Selman Reis corresponding with Pargalı Ibrahim Pasha describes the region:

Near a port known as Zaylaʿ lies a city called Janasir. Its rulers are called Mujahid, and they are very pious. Most scholarly books are distributed from Zaylaʿ. This province is the frontier of Islam. Every year, raids are carried out against the infidels Habash, in the path of Allah, through jihad, and they fight with fierce determination.

Portuguese Jesuit missionary Manuel de Almeida, writing in the early seventeenth century, provided a detailed account of the sixteenth-century Oromo invasions into Ethiopia, which he described as a form of divine retribution directed at Abyssinia and the Adal Sultanate. He noted that the incursions began during the reign of Emperor Dawit II, coinciding with the campaigns of Gragn, and struck both the Kingdom of Bale and Adal (Zayla). In his view, the Oromo weakened the rival powers simultaneously, serving as a mutual scourge and omen for both sides, while he was also implicitly urging Ethiopia to “abominate the heresies of Eutyches and Dioscurus” and align with the Catholic Church in Portugal.

The seventeenth century saw the decline of Adal, described as being divided into smaller separate states due to the “long and bloody” wars waged on Abyssinia. According to Samuel Augustus Mitchell, the neighbouring port of Berbera was flourishing in trade stretching through depths of Ethiopia from the Emirate of Harar whose Sultan ruled over the Somalis. However during this period, British government official James Henson noted that Berbera and Zeila was controlled by the local Somali merchant Sharmake Ali Saleh.

== Inhabitants ==
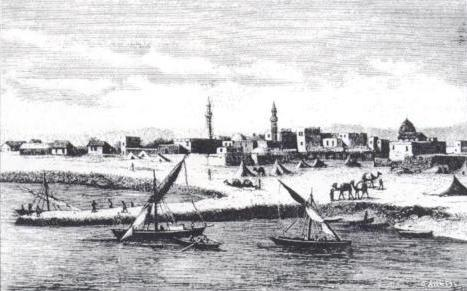
Coastline of Zeila (c. 19th century) its strategic location and proximity to the Red Sea was of great importance to the rulers of the region.

According to John Fage and I.M. Lewis, the main inhabitants of Zeila were ancestral to the Somali tribes who historically resided in the region. According to British explorer Richard Burton, In Ibn Battuta’s 13th-century travels, the “Berbers” he describes as living from Zeila to Mogadishu were in fact Somalis, who were followers of the Shafi‘i school of jurisprudence, al-Maqrizi also mentions the "Kingdom of Zayla" using the Harari moniker. The Somalis were among the earliest converts to the Islamic religion. Often presented as evidence for this conversion is the Masjid al-Qiblatayn built in Zeila during the first Migration to Abyssinia.

With the spread of Islam into Africa in the seventh century, the Somali language, especially certain northern dialects were influenced immensely by Arabic as well as the Harari language with traditional titles such as Garad, Malaq, and Aw adopted by various Somali clans. The Zeila region itself positioned at the crossroads of two continents has often been included under the sphere of the South Semitic languages.

In the nineteenth century the inhabitants of Zeila narrated to one British commissioner that the ruined town of Amud (in the Zeila region) was built by the ancient Harla people. The British commissioner attested to the similarities between the ruins of Amud and that of the walled city of Harar.
