= An-Nasir Ahmad =

An-Nasir Ahmad or Al-Nasir Ahmad may refer to:

- An-Nasir Ahmad (Zaidi imam), the imam of the Zaidi state in Yemen in the 10th century
- An-Nasir Ahmad, Sultan of Egypt, the Mamluk sultan of Egypt in 1342
- Al-Nasir Ahmad ibn Isma'il, sultan of Yemen (r. 1400–1424)
