= Al-Afdal =

Al-Afdal (Arabic: الأفضل, "most superior") is an Arabic name which means "Most Superior". It may refer to:

- Al-Afdal Shahanshah (1066–1121), vizier of the Fatimid caliphs of Egypt
- Al-Afdal ibn Salah ad-Din (1186–1196), Muslim ruler and eldest son of Saladin who inherited Damascus
- Al-Afdal al-Abbas (1363–1377), a ruler of Yemen
