= Campaigns of Amda Seyon (1332–1333) =

1332 military expedition of Emperor Amda Seyon I against Ifat and its allies

Date	19 February 1332 – 6 January 1333 (Note: Dates are provided according to the Julian calendar, as in Tedeschi and Kropp.)
Location	Ifat, Dawaro, Mora, Adal and neighboring regions, mainly in the Awash River basin
Result	Ethiopian victory
Territorial changes	Ifat and its neighbors confirmed as tributaries of the Ethiopian king

Belligerents
Kingdom of Ethiopia	Ifat; Dawaro; Adal; Mora; Fedis; Gidaya; Harla; Hobat; Hargala; Zeila; and others (Note: These are the sixteen kings listed in the chronicle, and Kropp places all of their lands in Adal. Kropp notes that Ifat and Dawaro are not named in the list, since they were under Christian suzerainty.)

Commanders and leaders
Amda Seyon I Saga Krestos; Shawa Ra'ad; Yaneze' Aygabba; Sem Yeshal	Sabr ad-Din (POW); Haydara of Dawaro (POW); Jamal ad-Din (POW); Qadi Salih †; King of Adal †; King of Hagara †

Strength
Unknown	c. 14,000 (Kropp's estimate) (Note: The chronicle lists 16 kings and 2,722 "kings and commanders". Kropp reads its figure of 12,048 "mosques" as a corruption of a word for fighters, which gives a little over 14,000 fighters, or about 60,000 people including followers.)

Casualties and losses
Unknown	Heavy (no figures recorded)

The campaigns of Amda Seyon of 1332–1333 were a series of military expeditions led by Amda Seyon I, king of Ethiopia, against the Ifat Sultanate and a wider coalition of Muslim states and peoples to the south-east and east of his kingdom. The war began when Sabr ad-Din, who was the tributary ruler of Ifat, refused to submit to Amda Seyon. An Ethiopian force sacked his camp in February 1332. He surrendered after Easter, was imprisoned, and was replaced by his brother Jamal ad-Din. Amda Seyon then pushed on into Mora and Adal, Muslim lands further east that, according to the Ethiopian chronicle of the campaign, no earlier Ethiopian king had entered. Then, a large Muslim army gathered by a qadi (Islamic judge) named Salih attacked his camp on 3 July while the king was ill and most of his army was away. The chronicle says the king won a great victory almost alone. He then went back to the highlands by a different road, raiding as he went, and reached home in January 1333.

The campaign is known mainly from a text in Ge'ez, the classical language of Ethiopia, that has been named the Glorious Victories of Amda Seyon. Most of its editors have regarded it as a work written during or soon after Amda Seyon's reign. Some recent historians, though, have proposed that it was composed in the fifteenth century. Historians such as Taddesse Tamrat describe the campaign as a turning point after which Ifat and the other Muslim states of the region were firmly dependent on the Ethiopian crown.

== Background ==
=== Ifat and the Muslim states ===
By the late thirteenth century a belt of Muslim states and trading communities lay along the routes linking the port of Zeila on the Gulf of Aden with the Ethiopian plateau. Ifat, on the south-eastern edge of the plateau of Shewa and the slopes of the Awash River valley, was the largest of them, and its ruler held the highest rank among the Muslim rulers. It was ruled by the Walashma dynasty. An Arabic chronicle found at Harar and published by the Italian scholar Enrico Cerulli shows that the Walashma rulers of Ifat conquered an older Muslim sultanate of Shewa, ruled by the Makhzumi dynasty, and deposed its last rulers in 1285. In the same period they imposed their supremacy on other Muslim lands. In 1288 a Walashma ruler raided Adal and Mora and killed their lord.

The historian Salvatore Tedeschi describes two zones of Walashma authority: Ifat proper, on the eastern Shewan plateau and the slopes and valley of the middle Awash, and a zone of influence that ran down the lower Awash to Zeila and was occupied by Adal. The Egyptian writer al-Umari, who collected his information in Cairo in the 1330s from a scholar from Zeila named ʿAbd Allah, listed seven Muslim kingdoms in Ethiopia: Ifat (Awfat), Dawaro, Arababni, Hadiya, Sharkha, Bali and Dara. Al-Umari's informants told him that the seven kingdoms were weak and divided, and that if they united they could resist, but that they were jealous of one another. Some had submitted to the king of Amhara, as he called the Christian king of Ethiopia, and paid him a fixed yearly tribute. Although their rulers inherited power, none could rule without being formally installed by the Christian king, who chose among rival heirs. The other Muslim rulers nevertheless respected the high rank of the ruler of Ifat and sometimes came to his aid. Tedeschi notes that al-Umari called the early Walashma rulers qat, the title used for Muslim vassals in the Ethiopian system, and that no source calls Sabr ad-Din a sultan.

=== Amda Seyon and earlier wars ===
Amda Seyon, whose throne name was Gebre Mesqel ("Servant of the Cross"), ruled between 1314 and 1344 and was a grandson of Yekuno Amlak, who founded the Solomonic dynasty. In the early years of his reign, Amda Seyon conducted military campaigns in Gojjam, Damot, and Hadiya around 1316/17 and extracted some tribute from these regions. Shortly before 1332, Amda Seyon undertook another military campaign against Hadiya because its ruler Amano, influenced by a Muslim "false prophet", refused to pay tribute. Amano was captured, but the "false prophet" fled to Ifat and, according to the chronicle, became Sabr ad-Din's counselor.

The chronicle also recalls an earlier war with Ifat. Sabr ad-Din's brother Haqq ad-Din had seized a young retainer of the king named Te'yentay. Amda Seyon answered by entering Ifat with seven horsemen, followed by his army, and ravaging it and its dependent lands. While his army was away, Muslim pastoralists, the Warjeh and Gabal, and the people of Zega and Manz attacked him, but he defeated them and killed their leader Darader, Haqq ad-Din's son. Cerulli notes that Manz and Zega appear in this passage as allies of the Muslims but in Sabr ad-Din's list of 1332 as Christian provinces, so the Christian kingdom must have conquered them between the two wars. According to Tedeschi, Haqq ad-Din was killed in this war, and another brother, Jamal ad-Din, was a prisoner of the Christian king when Sabr ad-Din came to power.

=== Causes ===
The chronicle opens with Sabr ad-Din's rebellion. It says that he boasted that he would rule all Ethiopia, named Muslim governors for more than two dozen Ethiopian provinces, and threatened to turn churches into mosques and to make the king a camel herder. The text lists provinces from Shewa to Tigray in the north, and according to the German scholar Manfred Kropp, this list serves as a valuable document on the provinces of the kingdom at the beginning of the fourteenth century. According to the chronicle, Sabr ad-Din also kept the tribute he had collected for the king and imprisoned the king's merchants.

There are varying interpretations of these developments among historians. According to Taddesse Tamrat, Sabr ad-Din headed an effort to bring the Muslim states together against the growing Christian control of the interior, with religious leaders taking part in the organization, which gave the league the character of a jihad (holy war). He also stresses trade, pointing to the security of the route to Zeila as one of the major issues, and even hints that Sabr ad-Din timed his action to coincide with uprisings in the northern provinces. Cerulli similarly perceives the attack by Sabr ad-Din and the Muslim league as a response to the southern expansion of the Christian kingdom under the new dynasty. Tedeschi disagrees with calling this a jihad. He maintains that Sabr ad-Din was a vassal king who could not call a holy war, since he was neither an imam nor a sovereign sultan, and he views the rebellion as a bid to loosen Ifat's subjection, with the refusal to make the customary act of obedience to the king as its most significant act. The French historian Marie-Laure Derat similarly considers that the aim of the intervention was only to bring the sultanates back under an authority to which they were already subject and which they were trying to throw off. Kropp observes that some Christian regions of Shewa took part in the rebellion and that a copyist appears to have changed the text to hide this fact. (Note: Sources diverge with regard to Sabr ad-Din's descent. Kropp, relying on Cerulli, regards Sabr ad-Din as Sabr ad-Din Muhammad ibn Mansur and states that the Old Amharic imperial songs refer to the defeated ruler of Ifat as "Anbal Aboker", probably Hanbal Abu Bakr. Taddesse Tamrat considers him a son of ʿUmar Walashma. Huntingford, referring to al-Maqrizi, lists Haqq ad-Din, Sabr ad-Din, Jamal ad-Din and Nasr ad-Din among the sons of ʿUmar Walashma.)

== Opposing forces ==
=== Ethiopian army ===
According to Taddesse Tamrat, the army of Amda Seyon was divided into two major divisions. The first one consisted of a central army that belonged to the court. Its backbone was made up of various regiments bearing symbolic names like the Qasta Nehb, the Takwela and the Harb Gwanda, all under officers who reported directly to the king. Other troops belonging to regions or ethnic groups, such as the Korem, Barya, Gojjam, Gondar, Damot and Hadiya units, were also present. Many of them were probably recruited from conquered territories on the frontiers as well as from prisoners of war. The second division consisted of the militia of the Christian provinces, which was raised during emergencies and led by local chiefs. According to the historian Steven Kaplan, the king is credited with organizing the royal army into troops that owed their loyalty to the king and not to regional rulers, and he had no permanent capital, only a mobile camp.

These units are mentioned by name in the chronicle when it lists the units that were not present at the decisive battle. They include, among others, the Qasta Nehb led by Sem Yeshal, the Takwela led by Shawa Ra'ad, the Korem horsemen commanded by Wedem Ala and Degna, as well as forces from Gojjam and Damot. The historian Deresse Ayenachew points out that Gojjam and Damot contributed three big regiments of horsemen and foot soldiers to the war effort. The camp also included the king's queens and their households, priests with portable church tents, and servants.

=== Muslim forces ===
The chronicle describes Sabr ad-Din's men as fighting on horseback and on foot, with sword, dagger, bow, shield, lance, wooden spears and the dembus, an iron mace. Taddesse Tamrat describes the Muslim forces as made up largely of nomadic groups suited to surprise attacks and quick withdrawal, and argues that they lacked the unity and persistence of the Ethiopian army.

== Dating ==
The chronicle dates events by the months of the Ethiopian calendar. The campaign was dated to 1329 by the British scholar G.W.B. Huntingford, who relied on the chronicle's statement that Easter fell on 28 Miyazya (a month covering parts of April and May), which is correct for the year 1329. However, Edward Ullendorff dismissed this dating and maintained that the year 1332 was correct. This dating was also dismissed by Taddesse Tamrat, since according to a contemporary note Amda Seyon came to the throne in the year of grace 498 (an Ethiopian way of counting years), which makes 516 (AD 1332) his eighteenth regnal year.

Tedeschi proposed several arguments for 1332. According to him, the chronicle's year of grace 516 is consistent with its eighteenth regnal year. Easter in 516 was observed on 24 Miyazya, so Tedeschi believed that the chronicler, writing some time later, miscalculated the date of the Easter feast by four days. Friday 9 Hamle in 516 corresponds to Friday 3 July 1332, whereas 9 Hamle in 1329 fell on a Monday. Some manuscripts give the year as 516 and others as 517, and Tedeschi explained this inconsistency by the fact that the campaign extended beyond the Ethiopian New Year in late August 1332. Moreover, he based his dating on the Arabic History of the Walashma, in which Sabr ad-Din is said to have reigned for five lunar years from the Islamic year AH 731 (October 1330 to October 1331), so Sabr ad-Din could not have revolted in 1329.

Although Kropp agrees with the date 1332, he gives a different interpretation of the Easter date. He sees it as a scribal error for 18 Miyazya, indicating that the army's last march was made on Monday of Holy Week; Easter therefore fell on the following Sunday, 19 April 1332. He also points out that Ethiopian chroniclers counted the year of accession as year zero.

== Course of the campaign ==
The chronicle gives only a loose chronological frame, and few of its place names can be identified.

=== Defeat of Sabr ad-Din ===
On 24 Yakatit (19 February 1332), Amda Seyon sent his commanders against Sabr ad-Din, among them Shawa Ra'ad, Yaneze' Aygabba, Angotay, Te'yentay and Amlak Senah, with the cavalry commanders Degna and Wedem Ala. On the fifth day a few men of the Takwela ("Wolves") unit reached Ifat and drove Sabr ad-Din from his camp. The rest of the army followed, laid the country waste and plundered the camp, but Sabr ad-Din escaped by another route. The Christian narrative mentions the capture of a "capital" (hagara mangest) without naming it. Other forces were sent north under Saga Krestos, the governor of Begemder, against former Christians in Semien, Wegera, Salamt and Wagada, whom Taddesse Tamrat identifies with a revolt of the Beta Israel (Falasha), and another group of governors marched against a rebel named Nedhan.

On 6 Maggabit (2 March) the king left with the troops that remained. Kropp translates the chronicle as saying that he took a road "to the right", which Tedeschi, following Cerulli, reads as "the southern road". He reached Dawaro, whose governor Haydara appeared friendly but secretly wrote to Sabr ad-Din proposing joint action against the king. He celebrated Easter at a place called Gasa and left his camp and Queen Zan Mangasha there. (Note: Older manuscripts use the name Gasa, but the more recent Haylu version used by Perruchon and Huntingford gives Gala. Tedeschi, using the name Gala, equates it with the Galalu plain on the right bank of the Awash near the Bilen hot spring.) He then raided the land of Samarya and, one night, rode off with only 27 young horsemen to raid, while his army searched for him.

Sabr ad-Din, now afraid, wrote to the queen that he wished to submit. After the king replied that he would pursue him wherever he went, Sabr ad-Din came in person. The king accused him of keeping the tribute and of aiming at the throne. The soldiers called for his death and tore talismans from his body, and the king had him chained but spared his life. Haydara was also imprisoned, and Jamal ad-Din was installed as ruler of the Muslim lands in place of his brother. Tedeschi places the surrender a few days after Easter and argues that Jamal ad-Din was released from prison for this purpose. Taddesse Tamrat notes that the queen's role in passing on Sabr ad-Din's request suggests that a Muslim group at court was pressing for peace.

=== Into Mora and Adal ===
The peoples of Adal and Mora then assaulted the king's army in night raids, killing men and animals and stealing goods. As the rains started, the commanders requested permission to return home; however, the king did not allow it. Jamal ad-Din came with presents and pleaded with the king to spare the other towns so that they could do business for him, yet the king declared that he would no longer be called his mother's son if he returned home without entering Adal. The king departed Gasa on 7 Sene (1 June). During three night raids by seven named peoples (Adal, Mora, Tiqo, Pagwema, Labakala, Wergar and Gabola), the king himself went out to fight the enemy. During one raid, a man struck the king from behind, cutting through his belt and armor and breaking his dagger.

The king held an army council on 28 Sene (22 June) and urged his troops to fight "for Christ" and no longer for a passing kingdom, citing a message he had received from a monk, Za Amanuel. According to Kropp, the army council usually decided where the army would stay during the rainy season; thus, the king's decision to continue the march broke with tradition. On 1 Hamle (25 June), the army crossed a large river known as Yas into Mora, where a storm destroyed the royal tents; the king had a herald proclaim that the storm was a sign of coming victory. In Adal, the army stayed in a place called Das near a watering place known as Fur, suffering from the heat and lack of water. The chronicler says that the priests there could not agree on which way was east.

=== The Muslim coalition ===
The chronicle says that a qadi named Salih, whom kings and governors honored and feared, gathered the Muslim forces. It lists 16 kings and many commanders by region, including Adal with 1,000 commanders, Kumgeday with 1,000 and Hagara with 99, and gives a total of 2,722 "kings and commanders". One of the places in the list is called Harar, which supplied five commanders. Cerulli identified several other names in the list, such as Gidaya, Hobat and Gamarar, with places in the Arabic chronicle of the sultanate of Shewa. Kropp suggests that the figure given as 12,048 "mosques" may be a corruption of a word for fighters. On that reading the coalition had a little over 14,000 fighters, or about 60,000 people with its followers, a figure he calls realistic.

According to the chronicle, Jamal ad-Din also joined the coalition and advised the king of Adal to attack, but the king of Adal moved before the troops of Ifat arrived, so as not to share the spoils. Kropp argues that the chronicler presents the coalition as a plot formed four months earlier so as to make the king's own advance into Adal look like a preventive strike. In his view the Muslim attack was itself a preventive response to the first Ethiopian king to march into Adal.

=== The great battle ===
According to the chronicle, on Friday 9 Hamle (3 July) the Muslim army surrounded the king's camp while the main body of the Ethiopian army was away raiding another country. The king lay ill and had neither eaten nor drunk for seven days. A page sent out to hunt saw the enemy instead, and scouts reported an army too large to count. The king rose and, despite the pleas of his queens, rode out saying that he would not die like a woman. Queen Zan Mangasha sent him water from the Jordan River and dust from Golgotha. A priest named Takla Seyon baptized the king with the water, and it was sprinkled on the soldiers and horses. The chronicle says the men with him were mostly millers, bakers and cattle herders.

His few followers fled at first, but the king charged on his horse Harb Asfare with a handful of horsemen, broke the enemy wings, and his own men returned to the fight. The chronicle says that he fought from the sixth hour until sunset, until his hand stuck to his lance with blood. The chronicler gives no casualty figures, saying the true number would not be believed. The absent units returned that evening, thinking their king dead. The next day Salih's body was found and crucified at the camp gate, and a woman described as a sorceress was killed. Kropp places the battle between 9 and 19 Hamle, very probably on 14 Hamle (8 July), while Tedeschi places it on 9 Hamle itself.

=== Return through Adal ===
The king rejected a return by the road they had come, saying that only an animal does that, and chose to go back through Adal. His detachments raided Ziba, Ta'arak, Dabi, Zasay and Abalgi. At Zasay a ruler named Abdallah, compared to a bishop, was killed. At Talag, the residence of the king of Adal, the dead king's three sons and his brother came to submit, barefoot and carrying a stone on their heads, and sent word to the remaining rulers. The king of Hagara refused and swore with his people to fight to the death. At Marmagab the women of Hagara fought alongside the men, and Amda Seyon shot the king of Hagara through the neck with an arrow. The chronicle does not say that Talag was destroyed, and Tedeschi suggests that the submission of the king's sons spared it.

The army celebrated the feast of John the Baptist, the Ethiopian New Year (29 August 1332), at Sasogi, where the king ordered mosques destroyed. On 11 Maskaram (8 September) it crossed a river called Zar'at to Arate, where local people mutilated soldiers who went out for water or wood. The king answered by repeatedly breaking camp and leaving troops hidden behind to ambush those who entered it. He spent eight days at Hargaya, where he celebrated the Feast of the Cross. (Note: The chronicle gives the month of the Zar'at crossing as Nahase, but both Kropp and Tedeschi have corrected it to Maskaram, as the New Year had already been mentioned.)

At Baqul-Zar, a district of Ifat, the king made Jamal ad-Din hand over Christians who had converted to Islam, and had them flogged and branded as slaves. When the king demanded the remaining converts, Jamal ad-Din blamed his brother's son. He then imprisoned the nephew for show, but the king saw this as a trick, imprisoned Jamal ad-Din, and gave his office to another brother, Nasr ad-Din. Tedeschi suggests that the nephew was probably ʿAli ibn Sabr ad-Din, who later ruled Ifat for about forty years. The army then raided Get, Harla, Delhoya and Dagwa and the pastoral Warjeh, and devastated Dawaro to punish Haydara's treachery and the robbing of royal messengers. The king celebrated Christmas in Dawaro and the feast of Epiphany (6 January 1333) at Bahla, where he imprisoned Yosef, governor of Sarka, for joining the Dawaro rising. He then returned home.

=== Route and geography ===
Most places in the narrative cannot be located with confidence. Huntingford proposed that the campaign was fought in the hot lowlands east of the Awash. In his reconstruction the king went from Taguelat in northern Shewa north and then east, crossed the Awash (which he thought the chronicle calls the Yas), and fought near Fursi, about 35 miles north-west of Lake Abbe. He suggested that Talag might be a place called Datalg Ali, and that the rivers Ekua and Zar'at might be the Awash and the Borkenna. He admitted that this route was very tentative. Taddesse Tamrat rejected Huntingford's route and suggested that the campaign followed roughly the line of the modern Addis Ababa-Djibouti railway along the northern slopes of the Harar plateau, a route he believes the Muslim leader Ahmad Gragn also used two centuries later.

Tedeschi proposed another reconstruction. He argued that the king crossed the Awash in Dawaro, upstream of Ifat, and went down the valley to Gala on a caravan route from Ifat to the coast, so cutting off Sabr ad-Din's escape and any help from the east. He located Das on the left bank of the Awash near Lake Hertale, suggested that Talag might refer to the area of Zeila, and wondered whether Hagara and Marmagab might be linked to place names near Dire Dawa. Taddesse Tamrat notes that it is impossible to tell how far east the king went, and that the claim of the eighteenth-century traveler James Bruce that he entered Zeila may come from the chronicle's mention of a "king of Zeila" in the coalition.

== Aftermath ==
According to Taddesse Tamrat, the campaign made the dependent status of the Muslim provinces "an accomplished fact". He explains the result by the Ethiopian army's organization and the disunity of the Muslim league. Derat notes that the campaigns did not lead to an outright annexation of the Muslim territories, but extended the influence of the Christian kingdom to the south and east. Al-Umari's account, written soon after, describes the Muslim rulers as tributaries who needed the Christian king's investiture. The historians Amélie Chekroun and Bertrand Hirsch note that the chronicle and al-Umari give a similar picture of the dependence of the main Muslim powers on the Christian state.

Al-Umari also reports that ʿAbd Allah of Zeila, his informant, intervened at the Mamluk court in Cairo when an ambassador of the Christian king arrived there. ʿAbd Allah obtained an order for the Coptic Patriarch in Egypt to write to the king forbidding him to commit abuses in Muslim lands, and the Patriarch did so. Maurice Gaudefroy-Demombynes, al-Umari's translator, took ʿAbd Allah to be the head of an embassy of Ethiopian Muslims to Cairo and dated it between 1332 and 1338. The historian Richard Pankhurst notes that ʿAbd Allah described Ifat to al-Umari as a tributary of the Ethiopian king and that its foreign trade probably passed almost entirely through Zeila.

Ifat remained under Walashma rulers subject to Christian oversight. The History of the Walashma gives Sabr ad-Din's successor ʿAli a reign of forty years. According to the Egyptian historian al-Maqrizi, ʿAli was the first to break the customary allegiance to the Christian king, but was forced back into it by a revolt of his own people. Later, the sultan Haqq ad-Din II left Ifat to build a power base further east.

== Legacy ==
Amda Seyon's fame spread well beyond Ethiopia. Taddesse Tamrat notes that the chancery of the Mamluk sultans addressed him with titles such as "the glory of the Christian religion". The Italian scholar Paolo Marrassini notes that news of his victories reached Europe through Egypt, where they had made a great impression. His throne name Gebre Mesqel was translated into Arabic as ʿAbd as-Salib. It appears as "Abdeselib" in the Spanish Libro del Conoscimiento (about 1350) and as "Senap" on Angelino Dalorto's world map of 1339, which gives its meaning as "Servant of the Cross". It later became "Senapo" in Ariosto's Orlando Furioso. Kropp notes that the conflict over the king's marriages may explain why al-Umari could suppose that he had secretly converted to Islam.

The king's wars are also remembered in the Old Amharic imperial songs. Four songs are thought to refer to Amda Seyon. Huntingford translated them from a manuscript in the Bodleian Library written between 1592 and 1605, and one describes the army crossing the Awash and then the Wabi, which he connects with the campaign in Dawaro. Kropp notes that the many names in these songs make them a useful supplement to the chronicle. Some scholars, such as Hirsch and Carsten Hoffmann, place the composition or writing down of the songs later, in the fifteenth or sixteenth century.

== Sources ==
=== The chronicle ===
The main source is a Ge'ez narrative of the campaign, called the Glorious Victories of Amda Seyon in English. Huntingford took this title from a phrase near the end of the text, since the work has no title of its own. It survives in seven Ge'ez manuscripts and an Amharic version. The oldest is a Bodleian Library manuscript brought to Europe by James Bruce and dated 1592, written by order of King Sarsa Dengel. Four of the others belong to a later version associated with the eighteenth-century nobleman Dajjazmach Haylu. The Jesuit missionary Pedro Páez made a Portuguese summary in Ethiopia, which Marrassini considers the oldest witness to the best manuscript tradition. Bruce later retold the story freely in his Travels.

August Dillmann published a German translation in 1884, and Jules Perruchon edited the text in 1889 from two late manuscripts. Huntingford published an English translation in 1965, which Ullendorff criticized severely in a review. Two critical editions appeared in the 1990s: Marrassini's, with an Italian translation (1993), and Kropp's, with a German translation (1994).

=== Other sources ===
Other evidence includes the imperial songs and the king's charters. Arabic sources give the Muslim side. These include al-Umari's Masalik al-absar (written in the 1330s and 1340s), al-Maqrizi's Kitab al-Ilmam (completed in 1438), and the History of the Walashma, published by Cerulli. Archaeologists have also located Awfat, the fourteenth-century capital of Ifat, and published inscribed tombs of members of the Walashma family.

== Nature of the source ==
The chronicle's dating and authenticity are disputed. Most of the editors or analysts of the chronicle, including Huntingford, Tedeschi, Marrassini, and Kropp, view it as a document written either during or shortly after the reign of Amda Seyon, while historians like Taddesse Tamrat have considered it the principal historical source for this period. More recently, Hirsch and some other scholars have maintained that the chronicle was written later than is generally thought. As Emmie Le Galès states, the issue remains open. Alessandro Bausi observes that the document still attracts historians because of its textual problems and the debate over its dating and interpretation.

=== Case for a contemporary text ===
Early scholars like Dillmann and Perruchon believed that the text was written much later because of its reference to Tewodros and Galawdewos, who were believed to be the Ethiopian kings of these names. However, Huntingford showed that they were actually two martyrs of Antioch rather than kings, and concluded that the text was probably written during the reign of Amda Seyon. Tedeschi argued that since the last lines of the text ask God to grant the king a long life, it must have been written between the king's return in 1333 and his death in 1344. For Marrassini, this closing wish was an important and perhaps decisive sign that the text was written in the king's lifetime. Hoffmann notes that the formula itself is normally used only for the living, and that the text quotes the Ascension of Isaiah, a book that was no longer quoted after about 1400.

Kropp considers the author very probably a contemporary and eyewitness. He describes the core account of the itinerary as precise, notes expressions such as "it seemed to us", and suggests that the lists of governors and of the enemy army were taken from original documents. Some of the offices named in the text match contemporary records. The offices of Ma'kala Tawazat and Ma'kala Bahr, for example, appear together in a charter of Amda Seyon dated 1328. He also argues that the structure of the enemy army list speaks for its authenticity. He had once considered that it might be an edifying work from the time of the sixteenth-century king Lebna Dengel, but rejected the idea, partly because the prophecy that Muslim rule would end after 700 years would have sounded like mockery to a sixteenth-century audience.

In a study of the chronicle's dating, Tedeschi found that the dates within the chronicle are consistent with the year 1332: the regnal year corresponds to the year of grace, and 9 Hamle of that year fell on a Friday, just as stated. He also noted that the chronicle's prophecy that Muslim rule would last 700 years, counted from Muhammad's death in 632, points to the year 1332 itself. In addition, Cerulli observed that several places mentioned in the list of allies correspond to places mentioned in a thirteenth-century Arabic chronicle of the sultanate of Shewa. Further, Derat has observed that the listing of so many small provinces, many of which later made up the single province of Shewa, may reflect the fourteenth-century kingdom of Ethiopia before the fifteenth-century king Zar'a Ya'eqob centralized its administration. Based on this, she suggested that the chronicle may be older than Zar'a Ya'eqob's reign and could have inspired his Mashafa Milad ("Book of the Nativity"). Chekroun and Hirsch also note that the chronicle's picture of Muslim dependence on the Christian king broadly agrees with al-Umari's contemporary report.

=== Literary character ===
Both sides acknowledge that the text is not a simple chronological account of events; however, the supporters of the early dating do not regard its literary form as a sign of late composition. According to Kropp, the work is a campaign report written in a style typical of saints' lives, where the king acts as both a hero and a saint. Marrassini proposed a hypothesis according to which it was a homily addressed to the congregation, since phrases like "Listen, I will tell you" can be found in it, and advised against interpreting its typical tropes literally. Derat noticed that the story of a hero chosen by God who defeats a huge army, similar to the story of David and Goliath, appears both in this text and in the account of Zar'a Ya'eqob's victory over the sultan Badlay at Gomit in 1445; she considers such works closer to hagiography (writing about the lives of saints) than to military chronicles. In a 2025 article, Kropp refers to it as a "prose heroic song" about the 1332 campaign, written by a court official with literary ambitions who incorporated various documents produced in his office, such as tax lists, lists of provinces and titles, and lists of military units. He regards it as separate from the official court historiography of that period, which he believes was lost in the wars with Ahmad Gragn.

=== Case for a later date and responses ===
As Hirsch contended in 2020, the text is an epic fiction written in the first half of the fifteenth century, maybe under Zar'a Ya'eqob. Hirsch pointed to the many campaigns placed within a single year, including during the rainy season, and noted that the succession of four brothers as rulers of Ifat does not match the genealogies known from Arabic texts, which also do not mention a rebellion by Sabr ad-Din. He compared the text to epic poems such as the Song of Roland and suggested that it compresses memories of wars fought between about 1330 and 1430 into a single year, drawing on later sultans and on the accounts of the battle of Gomit. Hirsch treats these as hypotheses that still need to be verified, and he concedes that the text may contain older fragments from Amda Seyon's time.

Solomon Gebreyes Beyene has rejected this dating. He argues that Hirsch did not examine the many historical place names, military units and titles in the text, which are not attested in Zar'a Ya'eqob's chronicle or other texts, and did not adequately address the closing passage indicating that the work was written in the king's lifetime. He suggests that the parallels with the Gomit narratives exist because authors of Zar'a Ya'eqob's time used the Amda Seyon text as a source.

In her 2003 study of the royal domain, Derat considered the date of composition difficult to determine and concluded that the text rests on one or more testimonies contemporary with the events, but was given its present form later, in the mid-fourteenth or fifteenth century. Hoffmann similarly argues that the surviving form of the text may be later than the events, since it uses palatalized letters in names such as Shewa and Gojjam that he believes were not in use before about 1500. He allows, however, that it may rest largely on sources written close to Amda Seyon's lifetime. Two other studies co-authored by Hirsch also describe the text as a later compilation.

Whatever its date, the text has been widely used to study the period. Derat describes it as the first surviving source from the royal circle devoted to a Solomonic king, and Kaplan uses it to examine how the king's violence was represented and why it was remembered so positively.

== See also ==
- Amda Seyon I
- Amda Seyon I's expansions
- Battle of Das
- Ifat Sultanate
- Walashma dynasty

== Bibliography ==
=== Primary sources ===
Editions and translations of the chronicle and of al-Umari.

- al-Umari, Ibn Fadl Allah (1927). Masālik el abṣār fi mamālik el amṣār. I: L'Afrique, moins l'Égypte. Translated by Maurice Gaudefroy-Demombynes. Paris: Paul Geuthner.
- Dillmann, August (1884). "Die Kriegsthaten des Königs ʿAmda-Ṣion gegen die Muslim". Sitzungsberichte der Königlich Preussischen Akademie der Wissenschaften zu Berlin, Philosophisch-historische Klasse: 1007–1038.
- Huntingford, G. W. B. (1965). The Glorious Victories of ʿAmda Ṣeyon, King of Ethiopia. Oxford: Clarendon Press.
- Kropp, Manfred (1994). Der siegreiche Feldzug des Königs ʿAmda-Ṣeyon gegen die Muslime in Adal im Jahre 1332 n. Chr. Corpus Scriptorum Christianorum Orientalium 538-539, Scriptores Aethiopici 99-100. Louvain: Peeters. ISBN 90-6831-571-4.
- Marrassini, Paolo (1993). Lo scettro e la croce: La campagna di ʿAmda Ṣeyon I contro l'Ifāt (1332). Studi Africanistici, Serie Etiopica 4. Naples: Istituto Universitario Orientale.
- Perruchon, Jules (1889). "Histoire des guerres d'ʿAmda Ṣyon, roi d'Éthiopie". Journal Asiatique. 8th series. 14: 271–363, 381–493.

=== Secondary sources ===
- Bausi, Alessandro (2025). "Editing Historiography: A Few Introductory Words". In Solomon Gebreyes Beyene (ed.). Ethiopic Historiographical Texts: Textual Transmission, Edition, Translation, and Interpretation. Supplement to Aethiopica 13. Wiesbaden: Harrassowitz. pp. 1–12. doi:10.13173/9783447124645.
- Cerulli, Enrico (1941). "Il sultanato dello Scioa nel secolo XIII secondo un nuovo documento storico". Rassegna di Studi Etiopici. 1 (1): 5–42.
- Chekroun, Amélie; Hirsch, Bertrand (2020). "The Sultanates of Medieval Ethiopia". In Kelly, Samantha (ed.). A Companion to Medieval Ethiopia and Eritrea. Leiden and Boston: Brill. pp. 86–112. ISBN 978-90-04-41943-8.
- Derat, Marie-Laure (2002). "Élaboration et diffusion du récit d'une victoire militaire: la bataille de Gomit, décembre 1445". Oriens Christianus. 86: 87–102.
- Derat, Marie-Laure (2003). Le domaine des rois éthiopiens (1270-1527): Espace, pouvoir et monachisme. Paris: Publications de la Sorbonne. ISBN 978-2-85944-480-8.
- Deresse Ayenachew (2020). "Territorial Expansion and Administrative Evolution under the "Solomonic" Dynasty". In Kelly, Samantha (ed.). A Companion to Medieval Ethiopia and Eritrea. Leiden and Boston: Brill. pp. 57–85. ISBN 978-90-04-41943-8.
- Fauvelle, François-Xavier; Hirsch, Bertrand; Chekroun, Amélie (2017). "Le sultanat de l'Awfāt, sa capitale et la nécropole des Walasmaʿ: Quinze années d'enquêtes archéologiques et historiques sur l'Islam médiéval éthiopien". Annales islamologiques. 51: 239–295. doi:10.4000/anisl.4054.
- Gori, Alessandro (2020). "Islamic Cultural Traditions of Medieval Ethiopia and Eritrea". In Kelly, Samantha (ed.). A Companion to Medieval Ethiopia and Eritrea. Leiden and Boston: Brill. pp. 142–161. ISBN 978-90-04-41943-8.
- Hirsch, Bertrand (2020). "Le récit des guerres du roi ʿAmda Ṣeyon contre les sultanats islamiques, fiction épique du XVe siècle". Médiévales. 79: 91–116. doi:10.4000/medievales.11072.
- Hoffmann, Carsten (2025). "The Translation of the Tārika Walda ʾAmid and the Timeline of Ethiopian Historiography". In Solomon Gebreyes Beyene (ed.). Ethiopic Historiographical Texts: Textual Transmission, Edition, Translation, and Interpretation. Supplement to Aethiopica 13. Wiesbaden: Harrassowitz. pp. 75–88. doi:10.13173/9783447124645.
- Kaplan, Steven (2007). "The Glorious Violence of Amdä Seyon of Ethiopia". In Ahluwalia, Pal; Bethlehem, Louise; Ginio, Ruth (eds.). Violence and Non-Violence in Africa. London and New York: Routledge. pp. 12–26.
- Kropp, Manfred (2025). "Die Kompilation in der äthiopischen Historiographie: bevorzugte Gattung oder Zufall der handschriftlichen Überlieferung". In Solomon Gebreyes Beyene (ed.). Ethiopic Historiographical Texts: Textual Transmission, Edition, Translation, and Interpretation. Supplement to Aethiopica 13 (in German). Wiesbaden: Harrassowitz. pp. 13–48. doi:10.13173/9783447124645.
- Le Galès, Emmie (2025). "The Archives of Historical Research as Sources for the History of Ethiopian Historiography in the Twentieth Century". In Solomon Gebreyes Beyene (ed.). Ethiopic Historiographical Texts: Textual Transmission, Edition, Translation, and Interpretation. Supplement to Aethiopica 13. Wiesbaden: Harrassowitz. pp. 119–144. doi:10.13173/9783447124645.
- Pankhurst, Richard (1982). History of Ethiopian Towns from the Middle Ages to the Early Nineteenth Century. Äthiopistische Forschungen 8. Wiesbaden: Franz Steiner.
- Solomon Gebreyes Beyene (2022). "Pagan Religious Practices in Medieval Ethiopia: Development and Resistance of the Christian Kingdom (1434-1468)". Entangled Religions. 11 (5). doi:10.46586/er.11.2022.9864.
- Taddesse Tamrat (1972). Church and State in Ethiopia, 1270-1527. Oxford: Clarendon Press.
- Tedeschi, Salvatore (1979). "Le gesta di ʿAmda-Ṣeyon nella cronologia e nella storia". Rassegna di Studi Etiopici. 27: 123–146.
- Ullendorff, Edward (1966). "Review of The Glorious Victories of ʿAmda Ṣeyon, King of Ethiopia". Bulletin of the School of Oriental and African Studies. 29 (3): 600–611.
