= ʿAlī ibn al-Ḥasan al-Khazrajī =

Yemeni historian

Title page of the fourth volume of the five-volume English translation and Arabic edition of al-Khazrajī's al-ʿUqūd al-luʾluʾiyya fī taʾrīkh al-dawla al-Rasūliyya

Muwaffaq al-Dīn Abū l-Ḥasan ʿAlī ibn al-Ḥasan al-Khazrajī (1331–1410), called Ibn Wahhās, was a Yemeni historian who worked for the Rasūlid dynasty.

== Life ==
Al-Khazrajī's biography can be constructed from his own statements, the biographical notices in al-Maqrīzī and Ibn Ḥajar al-ʿAsqalānī and the Ṭabaqāt ṣulaḥāʾ al-Yaman of al-Burayhī. He was a native of Zabīd and a member of the Khazraj tribe. He was born in the year 732 AH, which corresponds to 1331–1332 AD. In his youth, he worked as a plasterer and painter in and around Taʿizz, decorating the Madrasa al-Afḍaliyya and the palace Dār al-Dībāj. He studied qirāʾāt (Qurʾān recitation) and became a qāriʾ (reader) in the mosque of al-Mimlāḥ, a village outside Zabīd. Al-Sakhāwī met him in Zabīd. He died in early 1410.

== Works ==
According to the 17th-century Ottoman writer Kâtip Çelebi, al-Khazrajī wrote three works of history. The titles and authorial ascriptions in the manuscripts, however, make identification difficult.

- Al-ʿUqūd al-luʾluʾiyya fī taʾrīkh al-dawla al-Rasūliyya ("The Pearl Strings on the History of the Rasūlid Dynasty") is his most famous work. It is a chronicle of the Rasūlids. For earlier times, it relies on the Kitāb al-Sulūk of Bahāʾ al-Dīn al-Janadī. For its flattering treatment of the Rasūlids, it has been compared unfavourably to the work of the Yemeni historian Ibn Ḥātim.
- Al-Kifāya wa-l-iʿlām fī-man waliya al-Yaman wa-sakanahā min al-Islām ("What is Needed and Information on Those Who Administered Yemen and Lived There in Islamic Times") is a longer chronicle of the Islamic history of Yemen. It incorporates a large part of the ʿUqūd al-luʾluʾiyya.
- Ṭirāz aʿlām al-zaman fī ṭabaqāt aʿyān al-Yaman ("The Class of Prominent People in the Generations of Yemeni Dignitaries"), also called al-ʿIqd al-fākhir al-ḥasan fī ṭabaqāt akābir ahl al-Yaman ("The Beautiful and Precious Necklace on the Generations of Yemeni Notable People"), was a biographical dictionary written at the request of King al-Ashraf Ismāʿīl I to continue that of al-Janadī. It is mentioned by al-Sakhāwī.

The Kifāya wa-l-iʿlām also circulated under the titles al-ʿAsjad al-masbūk fī taʾrīkh al-Islām wa-ṭabaqāt al-mulūk ("The Melted Gold on the History of Islam and the Generations of Kings") and Fākihat al-zaman ("The Fruits of Time"). The work appears to have been co-authored by al-Ashraf Ismāʿīl and possibly by al-Shihāb al-Muhallabī. A manuscript of the ʿUqūd al-luʾluʾiyya found in India was published with an English translation beginning in 1906. The Arabic edition was made by Muḥammad ʿAsal. A revised edition by Muḥammad al-Akwaʿ was published in 1983. Further manuscripts have come to light in the Great Mosque of Ṣanʿāʾ, in Iraq and in Saudi Arabia.

Other works by al-Khazrajī include a poetry collection (dīwān); Mirāt al-zaman fī taʾrīkh Zabīd wa-ʿAdan ("The Mirror of the Time in the History of Zabīd and Aden"), a lost history of Zabīd and Aden; and al-Maḥṣūl fī intisāb Banī Rasūl ("The Outcome in the Connection of the Banū Rasūl").

== Editions ==
- al-Khazrajī, ʿAlī ibn al-Ḥasan (1983). Muḥammad al-Akwaʿ (ed.). Al-ʿUquud al-Luʾluʾiyyah fii Taariikh ad-Dawlah ar-Rasuliyyah fil-Yaman. Beirut: Daaral-Adab.
- al-Khazrajī, ʿAlī ibn al-Ḥasan (1906–1918). Muḥammad ʿAsal (ed.). The Pearl-Strings: A History of the Resúliyy Dynasty of Yemen by ʿAliyyu ʾbnu ʾl- Ḥasan ʾel-Khazrejiyy. Translated by James William Redhouse. Leiden: E. J. Brill. 5 volumes.

== Works cited ==
- Bosworth, C. E. (1978). "al-Khazradjī". In van Donzel, E.; Lewis, B.; Pellat, Ch. & Bosworth, C. E. (eds.). The Encyclopaedia of Islam, Second Edition. Volume IV: Iran–Kha. Leiden: E. J. Brill. p. 1188. doi:10.1163/1573-3912_islam_SIM_4276. OCLC 758278456.
- D'Ottone, Arianna (2021). "al-Khazrajī". In Fleet, Kate; Krämer, Gudrun; Matringe, Denis; Nawas, John; Rowson, Everett (eds.). Encyclopaedia of Islam (3rd ed.). Brill Online. doi:10.1163/1573-3912_ei3_COM_35529. ISSN 1873-9830.
- Moorthy Kloss, Magdalena (2024). Unfree Lives: Slaves at the Najahid and Rasulid Courts of Yemen. Brill.
- Sadek, Noha (1997). "Notes on the Rasulid Historian al-H̱azrağī's Career as a Craftsman". Proceedings of the Seminar for Arabian Studies. 27: 231–233. JSTOR 41223603.
- Smith, G. R. (1969). "The Ayyubids and Rasulids: The Transfer of Power in 7th/13th Century Yemen". Islamic Culture. 43 (3): 175–188.
