= Battle of Das =

1332 battle in Ethiopia

- Part of Campaigns of Amda Seyon (1332–1333)
Date	3 July 1332 (694 years, 3 months, 2 weeks and 1 day)
Location	Adal 11°32′57″N 41°34′09″E
Result	Ethiopian victory

Belligerents
Ethiopian Empire	Adal; Mora; Harla; Fedis; Gidaya; Hargaya; Zeila; Hobat; and others ...

Commanders and leaders
Amda Seyon	Salih of Adal †

Strength
2,722 men	12,048 men (Ethiopian sources)

Casualties and losses
Unknown	~10,000+ killed
- Location of Das according to G.W.B Huntingford

The Battle of Das was fought in 1332 between the Ethiopian Empire under the command of Emperor Amda Seyon and a large Muslim coalition led by Salih of Adal. The Ethiopian army was victorious, and Salih was slain.

== Background ==
According to the chronicler, the Imam of Adal, Salih would assemble a large Muslim army made up of 12,048 warriors from various regions such as Gidaya, Hubat, Fedis, Dawaro and Hargaya and form an alliance with Ifat sultan, Jamal ad-Din, who was a vassal king of Amda Seyon. Despite their alliance, tension between Ifat and Adal leaders was evident as Salih refused to wait for the arrival of Ifat's troops under sultan Jamal ad-Din I before attacking the Abyssinians in order to avoid allocating the spoils of war with Ifat.

== Battle ==
In July 1332, Salih and his army set out to Amda Seyon's camp, surrounding him with their troops. According to the chronicler, most of the Ethiopian army left the camp to put down a revolt of the Beta Israel and the Emperor had with him only 2,722 men. Amda Seyon was very sick and lying in bed for seven days straight without eating or drinking. Zana Yamanu, the chief of the pages, was hunting when he encountered the massive Muslim army, he then warned the king who got out of bed and mounted on his horse. The Queen then baptized Amda Seyon with water from the river Jordan, upon which the chronicler claims that his sickness departed from him and Amda Seyon recovered his strength.

Early in the battle, upon seeing the size of the Muslim army, some Ethiopians had begun to flee. Amda Seyon then gathered a handful of horsemen and attacked the left flank of the Muslim army. According to the chronicler, Amda Seyon then took his spear and began slaying the Muslims, even killing two men with one blow. The Muslim army were forced into a ditch whereupon the king dismounted from his horse, took his shield and began to strike them. The king then mounted back on his horse and pursued the fleeing enemies with his men, forbidding them from taking any loot. When the enemy's left wing was fully destroyed, Amda Seyon and his men went around to the rear of the Muslim right wing, immediately dispersing them.

According to the chronicler, over 10,000 Muslims were killed in this battle, including their leader Salih.

== Aftermath ==
Following this victory, the Emperor went on to Ta’rak which he had massacred all who opposed him and returned to his camp. He then raided the town of Zasaye, and then destroyed it and slew the governor ‘Abd Allah; the town of Abalgi was next raided and all who resisted were massacred. 'Amda Seyon then marched into the district of Talag, where the king of Adal lived, the king of Adal was captured, and he and all his people were massacred. Then the three sons and the brother of the king of Adal came, and laying their sandals on their heads, they tendered their submission, did homage to 'Amda Seyon and begged for mercy.
