= Khazraji =

Khazraji is an Arab nisba referring to the Banu Khazraj. It may refer to:

- Ibn al-Iṭnāba al-Khazrajī, pre-Islamic Arabic poet
- Abū Dulaf al-Khazrajī (fl. ca. 952), Arab panegyrist
- Muhammad ibn Ibrahim al-Khazraji (died 1258), Arab historian
- Ḍiyāʾ al-Dīn al-Khazrajī (13th century), Andalusi author of the Khazrajiyya
- ʿAlī ibn al-Ḥasan al-Khazrajī (1331–1410), Yemeni historian
- 'Atika Wahbi al-Khazraji (1924–1997), Iraqi poet
- Saint Francis College v. al-Khazraji (1987), United States Supreme Court case
