= Ibn Hatim =

13th century official and historian in Yemen

Badr al-Dīn Muḥammad ibn Ḥātim al-Hamdānī, commonly known simply as Ibn Hatim, was a 13th-century official and historian in Yemen, under the Rasulid dynasty.

Very little is known about Ibn Hatim's life, all of which is gleaned from his chief historical work, Kitāb al-Simṭ al-ghālī al-thaman fī akhbār al-mulūk min al-Ghuzz bi’l-Yaman. His date of birth is unknown, but he was a member of the Banu Hatim clan of the Banu Yam, who were dominant in the region of the provincial capital, Sana'a. Although an adherent of Tayyibi Isma'ilism, he managed to have a successful career under the Sunni Rasulids, rising under Sultan al-Muzaffar Yusuf I (r. 1249–1295) to become one of only a handful of officials "employed by the sultan in the capacity of roving ambassador, personally representing him wherever in the country he was needed, now negotiating with recalcitrant tribes, now conveying a personal message from the sultan, at times even participating in military operations" (G. R. Smith). The date of his death is likewise unknown.

Ibn Hatim wrote two historical works, the first being Kitāb al-ʿIqd al-thamīn fī akhbār mulūk al-Yaman al-mutaʾakhkhirīn, a general history of Yemen, which has not survived. He is therefore known from his other work, the Kitāb al-Simṭ, a history of Yemen under the Ayyubids and the first two Rasulid sultans. G. R. Smith writes that despite a slight bias towards his own clan, Ibn Hatim's account is "a refreshingly impartial one", and contains much unique information about the country during the period it covers.

== Sources ==
- Smith, G. R. (2004). "Ibn Ḥātim". In Bearman, P. J.; Bianquis, Th.; Bosworth, C. E.; van Donzel, E. & Heinrichs, W. P. (eds.). The Encyclopaedia of Islam, Second Edition. Volume XII: Supplement. Leiden: E. J. Brill. pp. 387–388. ISBN 978-90-04-13974-9.
