= Rasulid Hexaglot =

14th-century multilingual glossary

The Rasulid Hexaglot is a 14th-century glossary written by or prepared for the Yemeni King Al-Afdal al-Abbas (r. 1363–1377), containing words in six languages: Arabic, Persian, Turkic, Greek, Armenian, and Mongolian. Although produced in Yemen, the Rasulid Hexaglot in many respect was a product of the Eurasian world that was shaped by the Mongol conquest. The Mongols brought East and West Asia into closer contact which encouraged the study of languages.

== Bibliography ==
- P. B. Golden, ed., The King’s Dictionary: The Rasūlid Hexaglot – Fourteenth Century Vocabularies in Arabic, Persian, Turkic, Greek, Armenian and Mongol, tr. T. Halasi- Kun, P. B. Golden, L. Ligeti, and E. Schütz, HO VIII/4, Leiden, 2000. Link Access The King's Dictionary: The Rasūlid Hexaglot.
