= Al-Nasir Ahmad ibn Isma'il =

Sultan of Yemen from 1400 to 1424

Ṣalāḥ al-Dīn al-Malik al-Nāṣir Aḥmad ibn Ismāʿīl (died 1424), numbered al-Nāṣir Aḥmad I, was the eighth Rasūlid sultan of Yemen from 1400 until his death. He succeeded his father, al-Ashraf Ismāʿīl I, and was succeeded by his son, al-Manṣūr ʿAbdallāh.

Al-Nāṣir Aḥmad was the last successful Rasūlid, attaining military victories in Yemen and receiving diplomatic gifts from China. The Chinese admiral Zheng He visited Aden during his fifth, sixth and seventh voyages. On the first of these, according to the anonymous Tārikh al-dawla al-Rasūliyya fī l-Yaman, an envoy from the fleet proceeded overland to meet al-Nāṣir in al-Janad in March 1419, bringing with him gifts of porcelain, musk, storax and silk woven with gold.

After al-Nāṣir's death, the dynasty declined rapidly, losing all power in 1454.

== Works cited ==
- Bosworth, C. E. (1996). The New Islamic Dynasties: A Chronological and Genealogical Manual. Edinburgh University Press.
- Moorthy Kloss, Magdalena (2024). Unfree Lives: Slaves at the Najahid and Rasulid Courts of Yemen. Brill.
- Ray, Haraprasad (1987). "The Eighth Voyage of the Dragon that Never was: An Enquiry into the Causes of Cessation of Voyages during Early Ming Dynasty". China Report. 23 (2): 157–178. doi:10.1177/000944558702300202. S2CID 155029177.
- Serjeant, R. B. (2000). "Yemeni Merchants and Trade in Yemen: Thirteenth to Sixteenth Centuries". In Denys Lombard; Jean Aubin (eds.). Asian Merchants and Businessmen in the Indian Ocean and China Sea. Oxford University Press. pp. 53–78.
- Smith, G. R. (1995). "Rasūlids". In Bosworth, C. E.; van Donzel, E.; Heinrichs, W. P. & Lecomte, G. (eds.). The Encyclopaedia of Islam, Second Edition. Volume VIII: Ned–Sam. Leiden: E. J. Brill. pp. 455–457. ISBN 978-90-04-09834-3.
