= Arabic-Persian-Greek-Serbian Conversation Textbook =

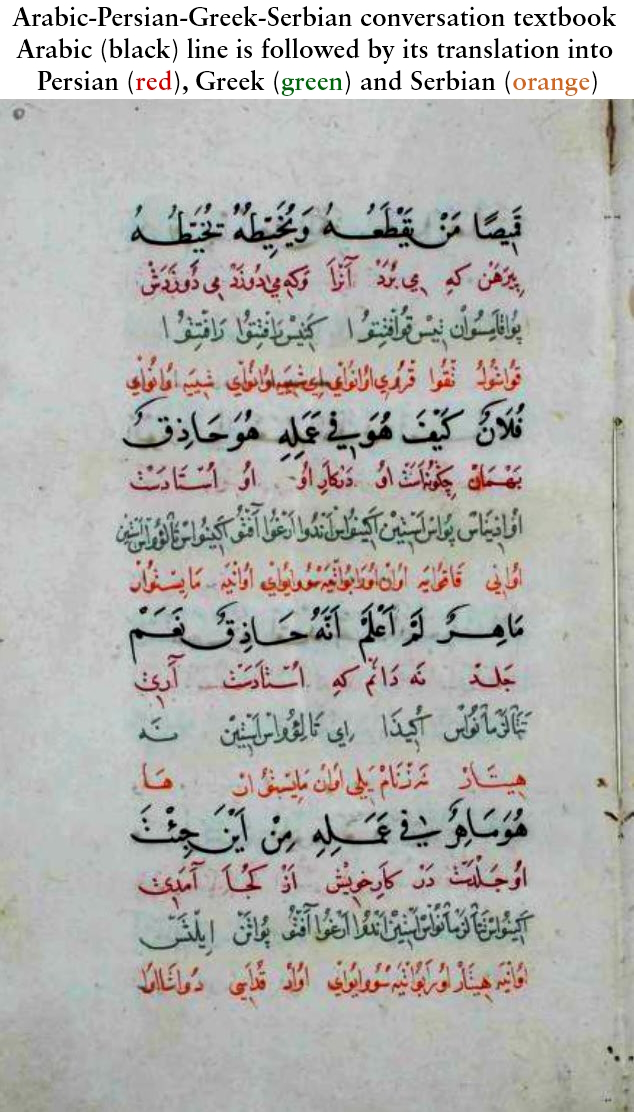
- Folio of the Codex
- Date: 15th century
- Place of origin: Ottoman Empire
- Language(s): Serbian (Shtokavian); Arabic; Persian; Greek

Arabic-Persian-Greek-Serbian conversation textbook is a book written in the 15th century in the Ottoman Empire. It is regarded as one of the oldest Serbian dictionaries.

== History ==
The work was created at the Sublime Porte. There is no exact year of publication, but it is considered that the textbook was created during the time and needs of Sultan Mehmed II the Conqueror and his sons.

== Concept ==
The title printed on the front page of this dictionary is "Lugat-i farisî, arabî ve rûmî ve sirb", which in translation means "Arabic-Persian-Greek-Serbian dictionary". It is composed of two manuscripts that are kept today in the library of the Hagia Sophia Museum in Istanbul. Despite the great similarities, they are not identical, especially the Slavic part of the text is significantly different in them, because their translators belong to two different dialects; in one it is Shtokavian-Ijekavian, and in the other it is Shtokavian-Ekavian.

The original text of the textbook is in Arabic. Each Arabic line is followed by its translation into Persian, Greek and Serbian. The Arabic text is written in strong black, below it, in smaller letters, in Persian, red, Greek in green and Serbian in orange. The complete text is written in the Arabic script (Aljamiado).

The textbook is designed in the form of a dialogue between two people, in which questions and answers alternate.

The text of the textbook is divided into wholes such as: trade, children's obligations towards their parents and teachers, studying the Quran, visiting the mosque, questions about the origin and occupation of the interlocutor, weather, working in the vineyard, working in the fields.

== List of archaic Serbian words included in this dictionary ==
- богобојник
- богострашник
- далекост
- даждан
- даждити
- говорац
- јестија
- јуха
- кто
- лагахно
- лажац
- лепост
- личник
- љубеница
- љубник
- многосмејац
- научитељ
- незнаник
- нитко
- оделати
- огојити
- ојутрити се
- оместити
- оснежити
- озорити
- полесан
- постник
- праздан
- премамитељ
- преварник
- примитељ
- проститељ
- работа
- седалиште
- слугати
- слушаник
- страшник
- сух
- удобрити се
- укривити
- уломити се
- умолити се
- уравнити
- уработати
- утамнити се
- увисочити се
- великост
- заборавњац
- злоговорник
- знаник
