= Al-Ashraf Umar II =

Third Rasulid sultan

Umar Ibn Yusuf
- عمر بن يوسف بن عمر بن علي بن رسول الغساني
- Born: c. 1242; Yemen
- Died: 22 November 1296; Yemen
- Era: Islamic Golden Age
- Known for: Astronomy, mathematics
Al-Ashraf Umar II
Sultan
- Reign: 1295 – 22 November 1296
- Predecessor: Al-Muzaffar Yusuf I
- Successor: al-Mu'ayyad Da'ud
- Dynasty: Rasulid

Al-Malik Al-Ashraf (Mumahhid Al-Din) Umar Ibn Yūsuf Ibn Umar Ibn Alī Ibn Rasul (Arabic: عمر بن يوسف بن عمر بن علي بن رسول الغساني), known as Umar Ibn Yusuf (c. 1242 – 1296) was the third Rasulid sultan, who ruled as Al-Ashraf Umar II. He was also a mathematician, astronomer and physician.

== Biography ==
Few biographical details about Al‑Malik al‑Ashraf ‘Umar are known. He was born in 1242 in Yemen, (Note: According to King. He was born after 1242, and before his father became sultan.) and he died in 1296. He excelled in astronomy, agriculture, veterinary science and medicine.

Al‑Ashraf ruled as the third Rasulid sultan for 21 months from 1295, succeeding after the end of the 46-year rule of his father, Al-Muzaffar Yusuf I. According to the historian David King. In 1266 he commanded a military raid on the Yemenese city of Hajjah. He was made governor of al‑Mahjam. He was in charge of the highland city of Sanaa, now the capital of Yemen. For a period al‑Ashraf ruled as governor of the flood‑irrigated lands near al‑Mahjam, which was owned by his family.

=== Family ===
Al‑Ashraf had six adult sons. Two of his daughters married sons of his younger brother and successor, al-Mu'ayyad Da'ud.

_{Data from the Encyclopaedia of Islam (1986)}

Family of Al-Ashraf Umar II

Al-Mansur Umar (1228-1249)
Al-Muzaffar Yusuf I) (1249-1295)
Al-Ashraf Umar II (1295-1296)	al-Mu?ayyad Dawid (IV) (1296-1322)
al-Mudjahid ‘Ali (1322-1363)
Al-Afdal al-Abbas (1363-1377)
al-Ashraf Isma*il (1377-1401)

== Astronomical work ==
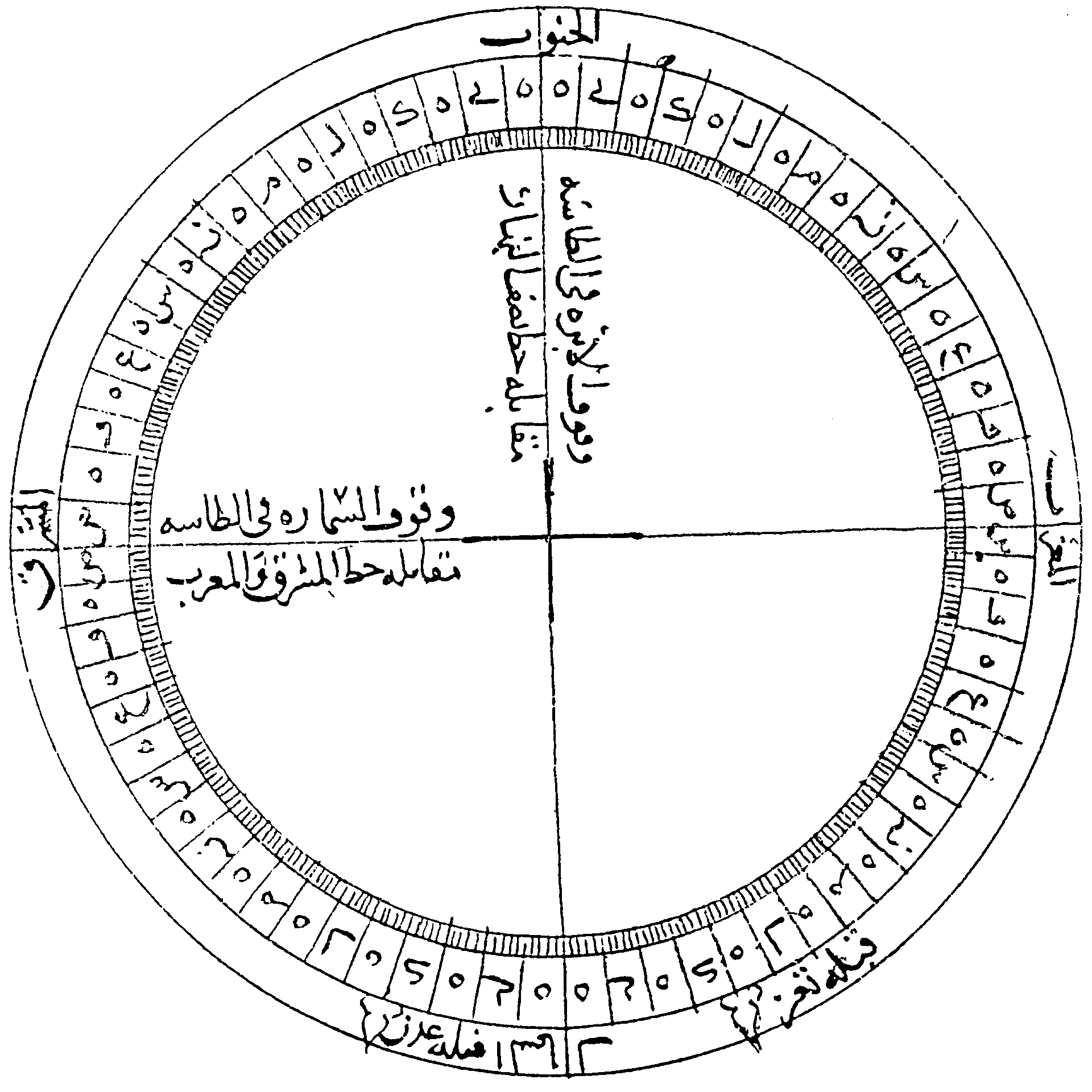
Al-Ashraf's diagram of the compass and qibla, copied in Yemen in 1293

Al-Ashraf wrote the first description of the use of a magnetic compass for determining the qibla. His works on astronomy contain information on earlier sources.

In a treatise about astrolabes and sundials, al-Ashraf included information on the construction of a compass bowl (ṭāsa). He then uses the compass to determine the north point, the meridian (khaṭṭ niṣf al-nahār), and the qibla towards Mecca. This is the first mention of a compass in a medieval Islamic scientific text and its earliest known use as a qibla indicator, although al-Ashraf did not claim to be the first to use it for this purpose.

Al‑Ashraf astronomical treatise includes the names of local Yemeni star names.

== Treatise on agriculture ==
Al-Ashraf's Milh al‑Malâha is considered by the historian David King to be crucial for constructing the history of agriculture during the Rasulid era. The work, of which two copies are extant, is the earliest Rasulid treatise about agriculture. The exact title is not known.

The seven chapters of the treatise consider the knowledge of times for planting, transplanting, working the land and improving it; cereal crops (zar‘); pulses (qatânî), crops grown from seed (hubûb); the cultivation of flowering plants (al‑ashjâr al‑muthmira); aromatic plants (rayâhîn); growing vegetables (khadrâwât and (buqûlât); and methods of pest control (âfât). The text would have been primarily of use to Yemenese farmers and landowners; there is evidence that Al-Ashraf obtained some of his information from other lands, although no other texts are mentioned.

== Sources ==
- Bosworth, C.E.; Van Donzel, E.; Heinrichs, W.P.; Lecompte, G., eds. (1986). "Rasulids". The Encyclopaedia of Islam. Vol. 8. Leiden: Brill Publishers. pp. 456–458.
- Schmidl, Petra G. (1997). "Two Early Arabic Sources On The Magnetic Compass". Journal of Arabic and Islamic Studies. 1. Oslo: University of Oslo: 81–132. doi:10.5617/jais.4547. ISSN 0806-198X.
- Schmidl, Petra G. (2007). "Ashraf: al-Malik al-Ashraf (Mumahhid al-Dīn) ʿUmar ibn Yūsuf ibn ʿUmar ibn ʿAlī ibn Rasūl". In Thomas Hockey; et al. (eds.). The Biographical Encyclopedia of Astronomers. New York: Springer. pp. 66–7. ISBN 9780387310220. (PDF version)
