= Mudhaffar Mosque =

Mosque in Taiz, Yemen

- جامع ومدرسة المظفر
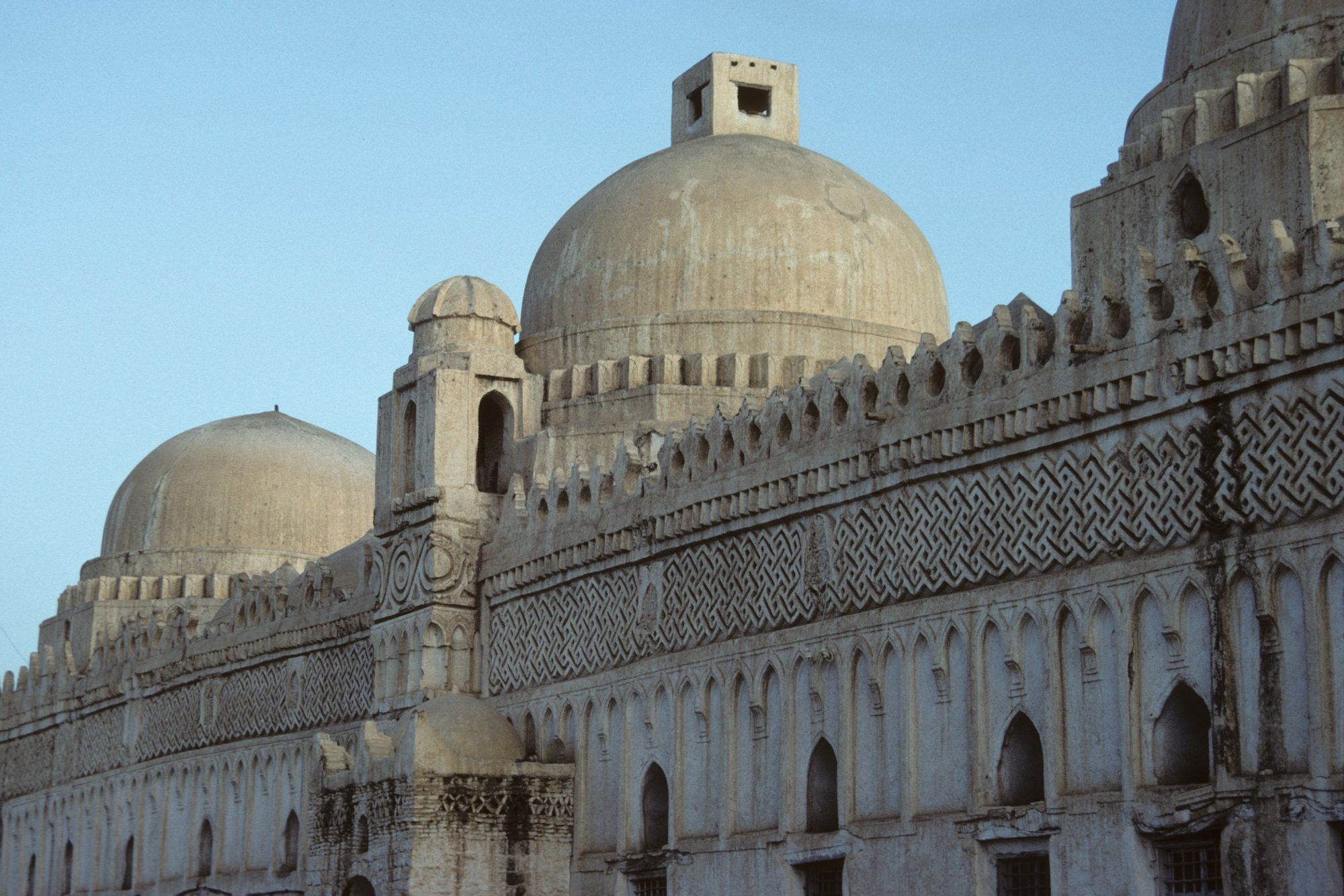

Religion
- Affiliation: Islam

Location
- Location: Taiz, Yemen
- Interactive map of Mudhaffar Mosque

Architecture
- Type: Mosque
- Completed: 13th century

The Mudhaffar Mosque (Arabic: جامع ومدرسة المظفر) is located in the center of the old part of the city of Taiz, Yemen. Built in the thirteenth century, the mosque is part of the oldest functioning public bath in Yemen. It is one of the two beautiful mosques in Yemen. It is one of the largest mosques of the old city and many of the residents attend the Friday prayers (Jumu'ah) there. The mosque was also home to a madrassa (Islamic school) that educated many Islamic scholars. Visitors from rural areas often traveled to use the mosque's baths, either for healing or as a ritual before a wedding.

== See also ==
- Islam in Yemen
- List of mosques in Yemen
- Late medieval domes
