= Rasulid dynasty =

Yemeni Muslim Dynasty

Rasulid dynasty بنو رسول (Arabic) Banū Rasūl
- 1229–1454
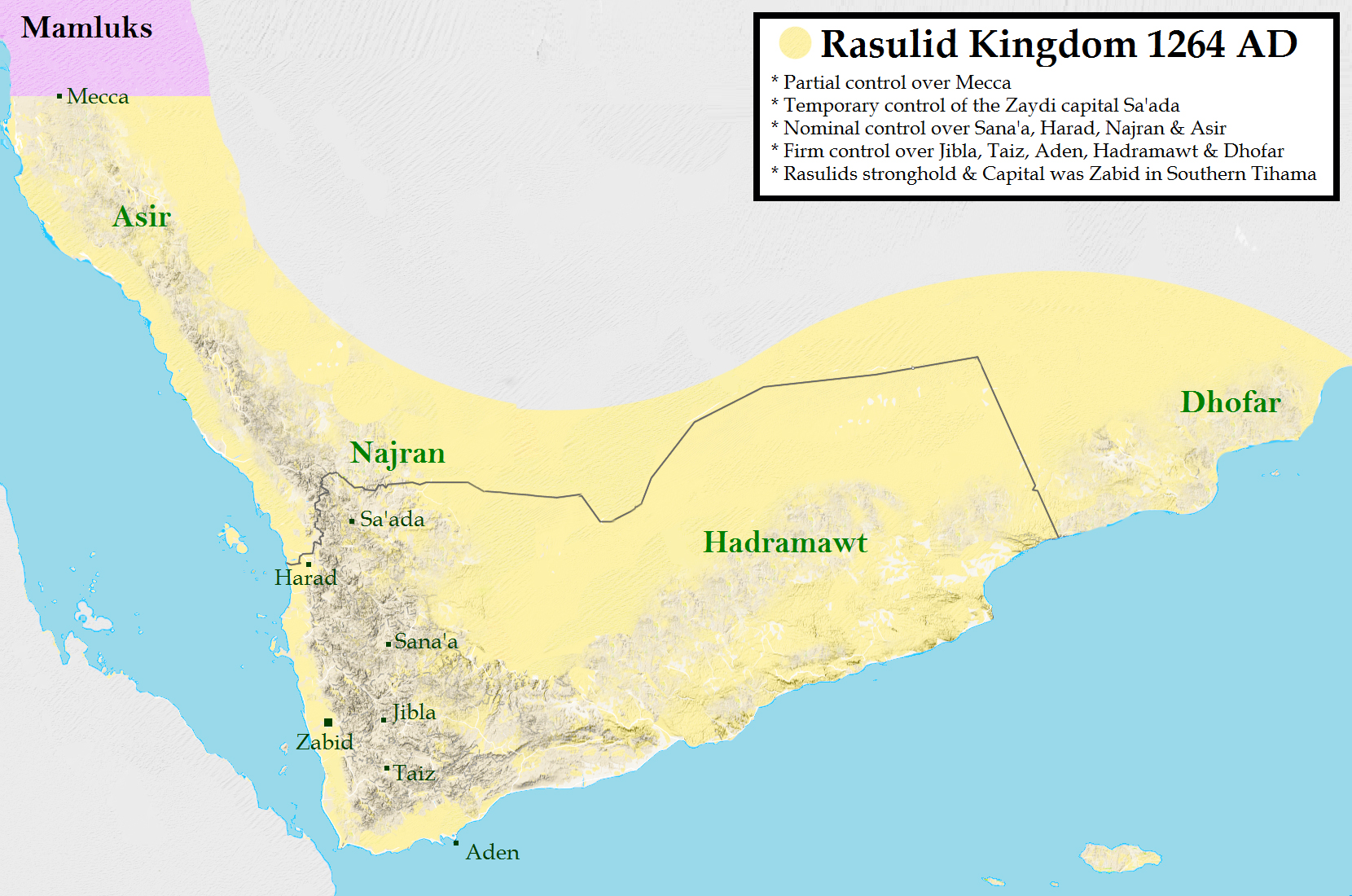
- Rasulid Kingdom around 1264 AD
- Capital: Zabid
- Common languages: Arabic
- Religion: Islam
- Demonym: Rasulid
- Government: Sultanate
- Sultan
- Historical era: Middle Ages
  - Established: 1229
  - Disestablished: 1454
- Currency: Dinar
Preceded by	Succeeded by
Ayyubid dynasty	Tahirid Sultanate; Kathiri Sultanate
- Today part of: Yemen; Oman; Saudi Arabia

The Rasulid dynasty or Rasulids (Arabic: بنو رسول, romanized: Banū Rasūl) were a Sunni Yemeni dynasty who ruled Yemen from 1229 to 1454.

== Origin ==
The genesis of the dynasty is disputed, with Rasulids being variously considered to be of Ghassanid Arab or Oghuz Turkic origin. Many modern scholars consider the Rasulids to be of Turkic origin and that they descended from Oghuz Turks, such as G.R. Smith, C. E. Bosworth, Roxani Eleni Margariti, (Note: Margariti calls them "Turkoman Rasulids".) Peter B. Golden, Jane Hatheway, Nile Green, and Daniel Martin Varisco. The Rasulids themselves claimed to be of Ghassanid Arab descent and supported genealogical works to back this claim. Some modern authors, such as Robert Stookey, have accepted this claim of Arab ancestry.

Some scholars, such as Irfan Shahid, have defended and favoured the family's claim of Arab Ghassanid ancestry. Shahîd argued that the Rasulids preserved a genuine awareness of descent from the Ghassanids, were proud of it, and questioned why a Muslim dynasty would have invented descent from the Christian ruler Jabala ibn al-Ayham, who was primarily remembered in Islamic tradition for joining the Byzantine Empire against the Muslims. David Nicolle suggests that the Rasulid family may originally have been Arab and subsequently became Turkified while retaining its Arab genealogy. Recent Arabic language-academic studies by Muhammad Maysar Muhammad Bahauddin and Mai Mohamed Adel Mohamed Ahmed also favour an Arab-Ghassanid origin, tracing them to Jabala ibn al-Ayham. Bahauddin further explains their identification as Turkomans as resulting from their ancestors’ settlement, intermarriage and linguistic assimilation among Turkoman communities.

G.R. Smith, writing for the Encyclopedia of Islam, concludes that in all likelihood the Rasulid dynasty was originally of Oghuz Turkic origin and writes: "The Rasulids take their name from a messenger under the Abbasids, Muhammad bin Harun, who was nicknamed "Rasul" (meaning "messenger"). Some historians and genealogists that served the Rasulid dynasty claimed an Arab origin for the family and pressed a Ghassanid descent for the family, a branch of the Azd. These same medieval historians and genealogists wrote that a distant ancestor of the Rasulid dynasty, who lived in the time of the Caliph Umar (r. 634–644) converted to Christianity and went to live in Byzantine territory. The children of his purported ancestor then migrated to the lands of the Turkomans where they settled among the highest of the Turkoman tribes, the "Mandjik". it is probable that the Oghuz Turkic "Mendjik" tribe is meant. In the lands of the Turkomans these children of the Rasulid ancestor "lost their Arab identity entirely and intermarried with the Turkomans and spoke their language". It was only about the time of Muhammad ibn Harun himself that the family moved to Iraq and from there to Syria and, finally, to Egypt. There, they were notified by the ruling Ayyubid dynasty. In all likelihood, the Rasulid dynasty was originally of Mendjik i.e. Oghuz Turkic origin".

Clifford Edmund Bosworth also states the Ghassanid ancestry to be concocted and their ancestors to be Oghuz Turks that had participated in the Seljuk invasion of the Middle East. The Turkologist Peter B. Golden states that:

Although a suitable Arab genealogy was created for them, the Sunni Rasulid house (1228-1454) appears to have stemmed from an Oḡuz Turkic clan, the Menjik (Menčik), a personal name also found among the Mamluks.

== History ==
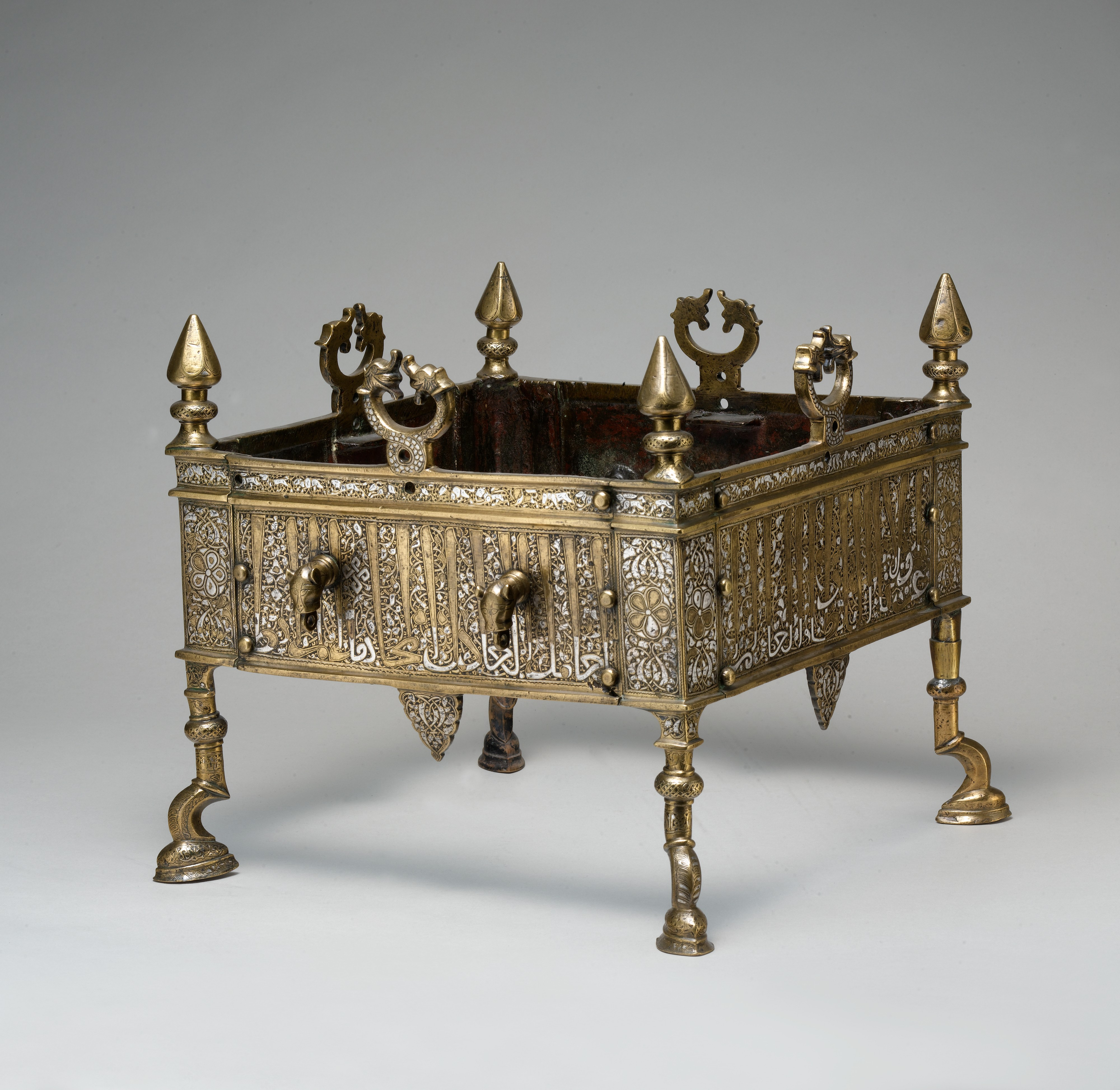
Brazier of Sultan al-Malik al-Muzaffar Shams al-Din Yusuf ibn 'Umar, 13th century

Originally a general of the Oghuz Zengid dynasty, Saladin, a Kurd, founded the Ayyubid dynasty. After the foundation of a separate dominion over Egypt, the Ayyubid army was still generally composed of Oghuz and Kipchak troops and mercenaries. After having the control over most of Levant, the Kurdish Ayyubids had held power also in most of Yemen since deposing the Zurayids 1173. The last of the line, al-Malik al-Mas'ud, left Yemen for Bilad al-Sham in 1229 and entrusted governance to an ambitious member of his own mercenary force. This was Umar ibn Ali who nominally acknowledged the Ayyubids of Egypt during his first years in power. However, he proclaimed himself ruler in his own right in 1235 after receiving a diploma of recognition from the Abbasid caliph al-Mustansir I. As sultan he was called al-Malik al-Mansur I. The regime was in a certain sense a direct continuation of Ayyubid rule, with power based on the control of military forces and Abbasid approval, rather than acquiescence from the local population. The coastal capital was established in Zabid. However, al-Malik al-Mansur fell victim to internal intrigues in 1249 when his own guards assassinated him at the instigation of his ambitious nephew Shirkuh.

The throne was taken over by his son al-Malik al-Muzaffar Yusuf I (1249–1295), under whom the Yemeni kingdom reached its apogee. The new sultan confirmed Rasulid rule over the Tihamah lowland and the southern highlands. Sanaa, one of the traditional centres of the Zaydi imams, was temporarily occupied, and the imams were defeated on several occasions. The cool mountainous city Taiz became the base of the dynasty together with Zabid. After the 1258 fall of Baghdad to the Mongols, al-Malik al-Muzaffar Yusuf appropriated the title of caliph. Yusuf died in 1295, having reigned for 46 years. When the news of his death reached the Zaydi imam Al-Mutawakkil al-Mutahhar bin Yahya, he commented:

The greatest king of Yemen, the Muawiyah of the time, has died. His pens used to break our lances and swords to pieces.

Eventually, they were unable to uphold the flourishing state constructed in the thirteenth century. A series of Zaidi imams managed to regain ground in the Yemeni highlands from the end of the thirteenth century, more importantly Zaidi imams managed to convert the Kurds of Dhamar (remnants of the Ayyubid military) into the Zaydi sect & pacified the Kurds of Dhamar, the Rasulid sultans were unable to score a decisive military success against rebels. Zaidi forces took Sanaa in 1324. The Mamluk sultans tended to increase their influence in Hijaz and the holy cities. In 1350 the Rasulid sultan al-Mujahid Ali was captured by Egyptian Mamluks in Mecca when he went on a pilgrimage, and was held prisoner in Egypt for a year. Sultan an-Nasir Ahmad (r. 1401–1424) was able to revive the Rasulid dynasty's declining fortunes and even received gifts from distant China. After his death in 1424 the dynasty fell into a period of upheaval and weakness, aggravated by the outbreak of the plague. Merchants from the east tended to bypass Aden due to the exactions and uncertainties there, going directly to Jedda in the Hijaz which was now part of the Egyptian Mamluk sphere of power. Unlike the previous pattern, when power struggles were only fought between the Rasulids themselves, various magnates interfered in the disputes during the last sultans. The most important of these magnates was the Tahir clan, which ruled Juban and al-Miqranah. A rebellion among the Rasulid's slave soldiers deprived the last claimant of any means to assert his position, after 1442. Lahij fell to the Tahir clan in 1443, followed by Aden in 1454. In the same year, the last Rasulid sultan, al-Mas'ud Abu al-Qasim, gave up his throne in favour of az-Zafir Amir bin Tahir and withdrew to Mecca. The new ruling clan governed Yemen from 1454 to 1517 as the Tahirids.

== State and economy ==
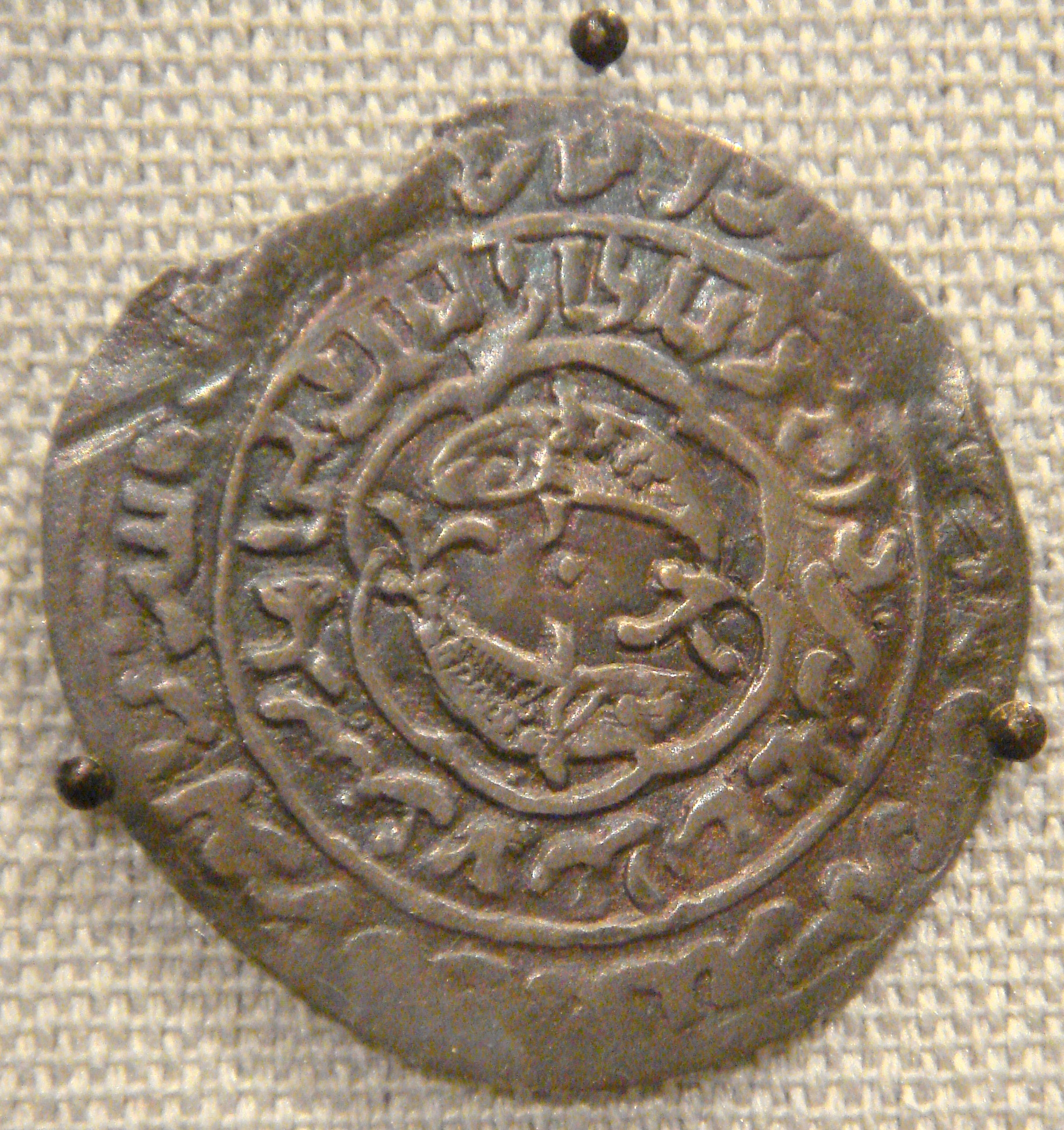
Rasulid coin, dated 1335

The Rasulid era is often considered one of the most brilliant in the history of Yemen. While the history of this region has usually been characterized by deep political and religious divisions, the extent of territory that the Rasulids ruled would not be superseded until (briefly) in the seventeenth century. The southern coast of Arabia up to Dhofar was kept under loose control. Rasulid influence stretched as far as Zafan near Salalah in Oman, where a side-branch of the family governed for a while.

The Rasulid state nurtured Yemen's commercial links with India and the Far East. They profited greatly by the Red Sea transit trade via Aden and Zabid. The economy also boomed with the agricultural development programs instituted by the kings who promoted massive cultivation of palms. The Rasulid kings enjoyed the support of the population of Tihama and southern Yemen, while they had to buy the loyalty of Yemen's restive northern highland tribes.

While the Hijaz fell to the Mamluk Sultanate of Egypt, the Rasulids temporarily held control over the holy city of Mecca, accordingly raising their own prestige. The Rasulid state was comparatively centralized and kept an extensive bureaucratic apparatus to oversee the collection of taxes and other needs of the state. In every larger city, two royal officials were placed called wali (or amir) and nasir (or zimam or mushidd). A considerable concern with the prosperity of the peasantry can be gleaned from the chronicles. Thus sultan al-Mujahid Ali (r. 1322–1363) based taxes on the average of production over several years, and deduced the grain to be sown as seed from the taxable produce. While the state model was taken from the Ayyubid state in Egypt, the Rasulids were more oriented towards trade. The sultans drew much of their income from taxes and customs revenues from the ports.

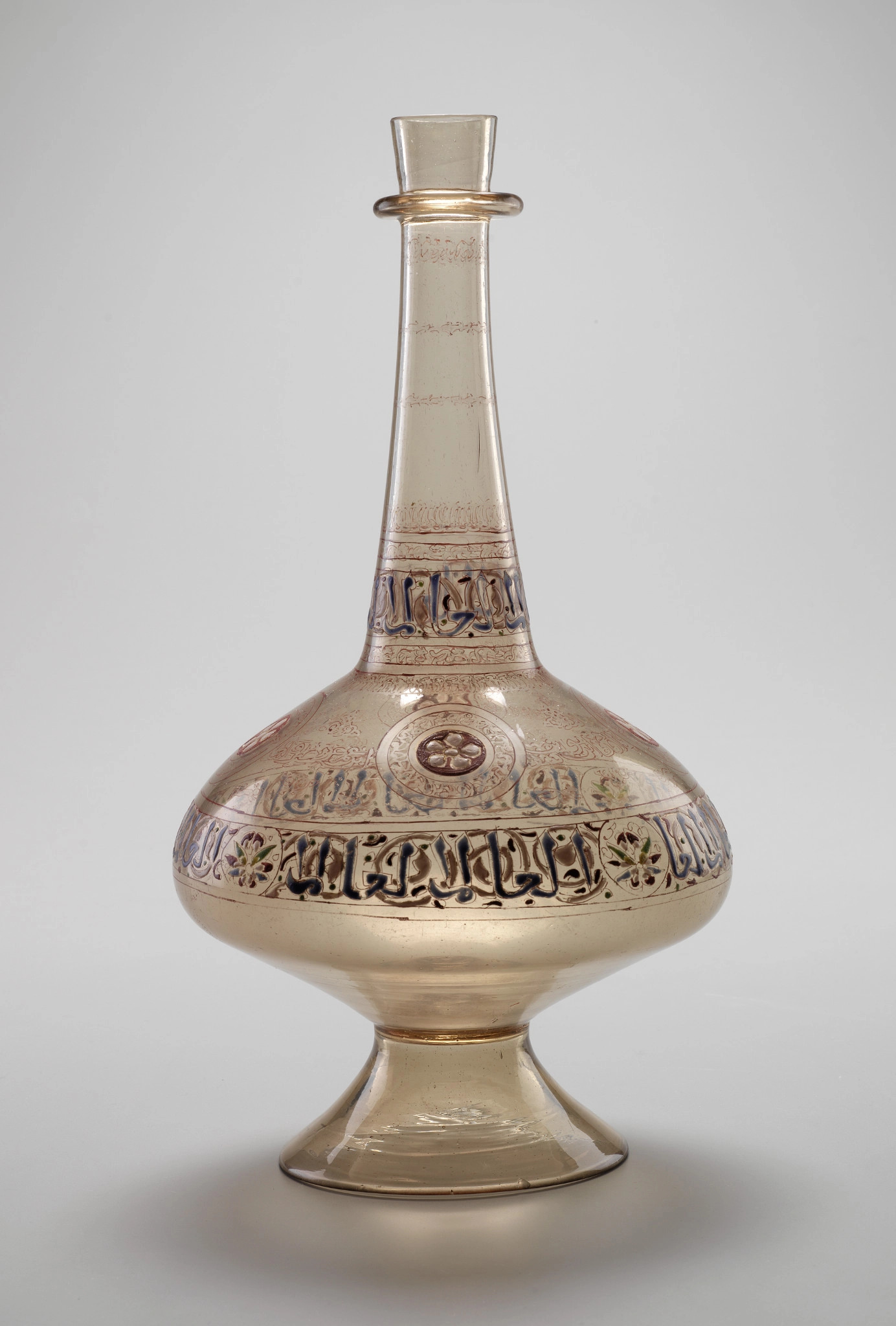
Bottle made for Sultan al-Mu'ayyad ibn Yusuf

Aden was important as a port where ships going between the Red Sea and the Persian Gulf and Indian Ocean stopped. Textiles, perfume and spices came from India, Southeast Asia and China, while slaves, ivory and pepper were brought from Africa. Among the more important Yemeni items for export were horses and agricultural crops. Jewish merchants could be found in the main ports as well as Indians, Africans and Egyptians. In his travel account, Marco Polo mentions the sultan of Aden (Yemen) in the late thirteenth century: "In his kingdom there are many towns and castles, and it has the advantage of an excellent port, frequented by ships from India arriving with spices and drugs... The sultan of Aden possesses immense treasures, arising from the imposts he lays, as well upon the merchandise that comes from India, as upon that which is shipped in his port as the returning cargo".

King Ahmad bin al-Ashraf of the Rusuild dynasty hosted the Walashama princes and sons of Sultan Sa'ad ad-Din II of Ifat after he was killed by the Ethiopian Empire.

Between 30 December 1418 and 27 January 1419, Ming China's treasure fleet visited Yemen under the reign of al-Malik al-Nasir. The Chinese envoy, presumably Admiral Zheng He, was accompanied by the Yemeni envoy Kadi Wazif al-Abdur Rahman bin-Zumeir who escorted him to the Yemeni court. The Chinese brought gifts equivalent to 20,000 miskals, consisting of expensive perfumes, scented wood, and Chinese potteries. The Yemeni ruler sent luxury goods made from coral at the port of Ifranza, wild cattle and donkeys, domesticated lion cubs, and wild and trained leopards in exchange. The Yemeni envoy accompanied the Chinese to the port of Aden with the gifts, which maintained trade under the facade of gift exchange.

== Culture ==
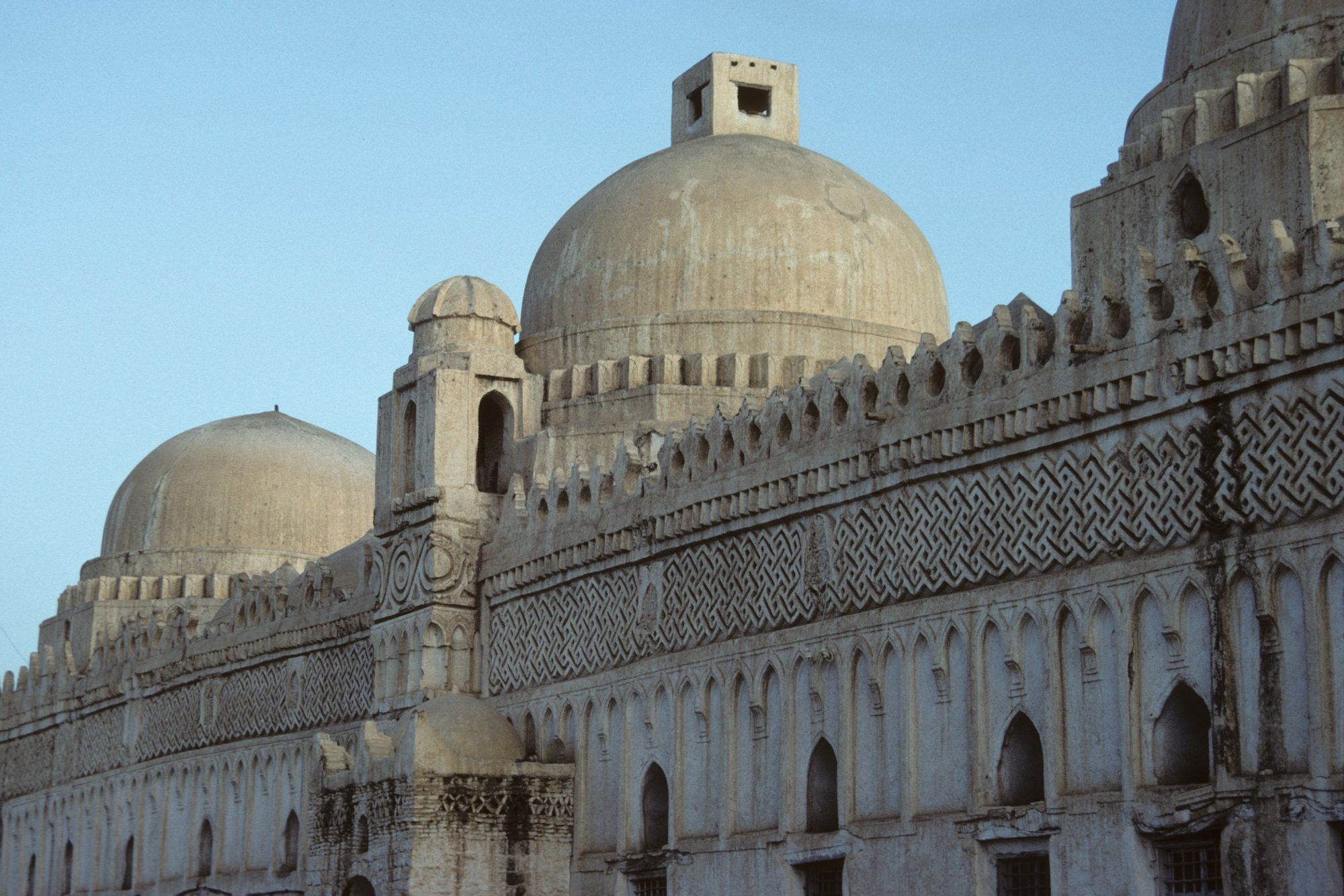
Muẓaffariyya Mosque in Ta'izz (13th century)

Several Rasulid sultans were culturally prominent, being men of letters who wrote literature and even treatises. Thus al-Afdal Abbas (r. 1363–1377) wrote an extensive compendium with passages about matters of practical utility, intellectual interest, and entertainment, Fusul majmua fi'l-anwa' wa 'l-zuru' wa 'l-hisad. His son al-Ashraf Isma'il (r. 1377–1401) authored a general history of Yemen. Most of the rulers built mosques and madrasas, embellishing Ta'izz and other cities with fine buildings. Among the most well-known monuments are al-Muzaffar Mosque (or Muzaffariyya Mosque) from the thirteenth century and the Ashrafiyya Mosque from the fourteenth century, both in Ta'izz. These monuments were inspired by models from places like Egypt and Syria and broke with the older Yemeni style of architecture. Coins were struck by all the sultans in the period c. 1236–1438. There were mints in several cities and the coins were characterized by symbols for each mint: fish for Aden, bird for Zabid, sitting man for Ta'izz, and lion for al-Mahjam.

== List of rulers ==
The following is a list of rulers of the Rasulid dynasty.

1. al-Mansur Umar I, son of Ali ibn Rasul, 1229 – 1250
2. al-Muzaffar Yusuf I, son of Umar I, 1250 – 1295
3. al-Ashraf Umar II, son of Yusuf I, 1295 – 1296
4. al-Mu'ayyad Dawud, son of Yusuf I, 1296 – 1321
5. al-Mujahid Ali, son of Dawud, 1321 – 1363
6. al-Afdal al-Abbas, son of Ali, 1363 – 1377
7. al-Ashraf Isma'il I, son of al-Abbas, 1377 – 1400
8. al-Nasir Ahmad, son of Isma'il I, 1400 – 1424
9. al-Mansur Abdallah, son of Ahmad, 1424 – 1427
10. al-Ashraf Isma'il II, son of Abdallah, 1427 – 1428
11. al-Zahir Yahya, son of Isma'il II, 1428 – 1439
12. al-Ashraf Isma'il III, son of Yahya, 1439 – 1442
13. al-Muzaffar Yusuf II, son of Umar ibn Yahya, 1442 – 1454

In 1454, the Tahirid dynasty captured Aden and ended the Rasulid rule.

Family tree of the Rasulid dynasty.

Rasul
Ali
Umar I r. 1229–1250
Yusuf I r. 1250–1295
Umar II r. 1295–1296	Dawud r. 1296–1321
Ali r. 1321–1363
al-Abbas r. 1363–1377
Isma'il I r. 1377–1400
Ahmad r. 1400–1424
Abdullah r. 1424–1427
Isma'il II r. 1427–1428
Yahya r. 1428–1439
Isma'il III r. 1439–1442	Umar
Yusuf II r. 1442–1454

== See also ==
- List of Sunni Muslim dynasties
- Imams of Yemen
- History of Yemen
- Islamic history of Yemen
- Ghassanids
