= Al-Ashraf Isma'il I =

Al-Malik al-Ashraf Ismāʿīl ibn al-ʿAbbās, numbered al-Ashraf Ismāʿīl I, was the seventh Rasūlid sultan of Yemen from 1377 until 1400. He succeeded his father, al-Afḍal al-ʿAbbās, and continued his patronage of literature and scholarship. He was also faced with several revolts and Zaydī raids. He was the author or co-author of a history of Yemen, Fākihat al-zaman ("The Fruits of Time"), which overlaps substantially with the Kifāya wa-l-iʿlām of ʿAlī ibn al-Ḥasan al-Khazrajī. On his death, he was succeeded by his son, al-Nāṣir Aḥmad.

== Works cited ==
- Bosworth, C. E. (1996). The New Islamic Dynasties: A Chronological and Genealogical Manual. Edinburgh University Press.
- D'Ottone, Arianna (2021). "al-Khazrajī". In Fleet, Kate; Krämer, Gudrun; Matringe, Denis; Nawas, John; Rowson, Everett (eds.). Encyclopaedia of Islam (3rd ed.). Brill Online. doi:10.1163/1573-3912_ei3_COM_35529. ISSN 1873-9830.
- Moorthy Kloss, Magdalena (2024). Unfree Lives: Slaves at the Najahid and Rasulid Courts of Yemen. Brill.
- Smith, G. R. (1995). "Rasūlids". In Bosworth, C. E.; van Donzel, E.; Heinrichs, W. P. & Lecomte, G. (eds.). The Encyclopaedia of Islam, Second Edition. Volume VIII: Ned–Sam. Leiden: E. J. Brill. pp. 455–457. ISBN 978-90-04-09834-3.
