= Al-Afdal al-Abbas =

Al-Afdal al-Abbas (Arabic: الأفضل العباس; r. 1363–1377) was a ruler of Yemen and a member of the Rasulid dynasty.

He was the son and successor of sultan al-Mujahid Ali. He produced a multilingual "dictionary" defining terms in Arabic, Persian, Turkic, Greek, Armenian, and Mongolian. He also took measures against extortion by local bureaucrats in the ports of the kingdom, thereby striving to maintain the attraction of Yemen in the eyes of foreign merchants. When he stayed in Aden one winter he was "dealing out measures of justice such are not usual. He gave robes of honour to the ship captains, and abolished many things recently introduced by the collectors of taxes. So the merchants departed recounting his praises and his abundant gifts in all quarters by land and by sea." At his death in 1377 he was succeeded by his son al-Ashraf Isma'il.

== See also ==
- History of Yemen
