= Campaigns of Jamal ad-Din II =

Campaigns of Jamal ad-Din
- Part of the Ethiopian-Adal wars
Date	1424–1429
Location	Horn of Africa
Result	Ethiopian Victory

Belligerents
Adal Sultanate	Ethiopian Empire

Commanders and leaders
Jamal ad-Din II; Ahmed ibn Sa’ad ad-Din; Harb Jaush	(Ethiopian Empire) Emperor Yeshaq † (Ethiopian Empire) Emperor Andreyas

Casualties and losses
Unknown	Unknown

The Campaigns of Jamal ad-Din were a series of military expeditions led by the Sultan of Adal, Jamal ad-Din II, during the early 15th century.

== Background ==
In the late 14th century, the Ethiopian Emperor Dawit I collected a large army, branded the Muslims of the surrounding area "enemies of the Lord", and invaded Adal. After much war, Adal's troops were defeated in 1403 or 1410 (under Emperor Dawit I or Emperor Yeshaq I, respectively), during which the Walashma ruler, Sa'ad ad-Din II, was captured and executed in Zeila, which was sacked. His children and the remainder of the Walashma dynasty would flee to Yemen where they would live in exile until 1415. According to Harari tradition numerous Argobba had fled Ifat and settled around Harar in the Aw Abdal lowlands during their conflict with Abyssinia in the fifteenth century, a gate was thus named after them called the gate of Argobba.

=== Rise of the Sultanate ===
In 1415, Sabr ad-Din III, the eldest son of Sa'ad ad-Din II, would return to Adal from his exile in Arabia to restore his father's throne. He would proclaim himself "king of Adal" after his return from Yemen to the Harar plateau and established his new capital at Dakkar. Sabr ad-Din III and his brothers would defeat an army of 20,000 men led by an unnamed commander hoping to restore the "lost Amhara rule". The victorious king then returned to his capital, but gave the order to his many followers to continue and extend the war against the Christians. The Emperor of Ethiopia Tewodros I was soon killed by the Adal Sultanate upon the return of Sa'ad ad-Din's heirs to the Horn of Africa. Sabr ad-Din III died a natural death and was succeeded by his brother Mansur ad-Din who invaded the capital and royal seat of the Solomonic Empire and drove Emperor Dawit I to Yedaya where according to al-Maqrizi, Sultan Mansur destroyed a Solomonic army and killed the Emperor. He then advanced to the mountains of Mokha, where he encountered a 30,000 strong Solomonic army. The Adalite soldiers surrounded their enemies and for two months besieged the trapped Solomonic soldiers until a truce was declared in Mansur's favour. During this period, Adal emerged as a centre of Muslim resistance against the expanding Christian Abyssinian kingdom. Adal would thereafter govern all of the territory formerly ruled by the Ifat Sultanate, as well as the land further east all the way to Cape Guardafui, according to Leo Africanus.

== Campaigns ==
=== Ascension ===
during the campaign of Sultan Mansur, the Adalites were struck by a catastrophe when Sultan Mansur and his brother Muhammad were captured in battle by the Solomonids. Mansur was immediately succeeded by the youngest brother of the family Jamal ad-Din II. Sultan Jamal reorganized the army into a formidable force and defeated the Solomonic armies.

=== Diplomatic Efforts and Initial Conflict ===
Jamal ad-Din subsequently reorganized his army into a formidable force. He was supported by an Abyssinian defector, Harb Jaush, who had by then proven himself to be a loyal and outstanding commander. As a wise and capable ruler, Jamal ad-Din dispatched Harb Jaush as an envoy to Emperor Yeshaq in an attempt to negotiate a compromise for peace; however, the negotiations ultimately failed. A battle ensued, during which Jamal ad-Din’s forces, alongside Harb Jaush, engaged the Emperor’s army, which reportedly consisted of 7,000 archers and swordsmen. The Ethiopian forces were routed, subsequently submitting to Jamal ad-Din. They agreed to pay tribute, with some factions even acknowledging Jamal ad-Din’s sovereignty.

=== Expedition to Bali ===
Following Harb Jaush’s notable military success against the Ethiopian forces, Jamal ad-Din once again entrusted him with command, dispatching him on an expedition to Bali. During this campaign, Harb Jaush reportedly decimated the local population, killing many inhabitants and taking numerous captives. The spoils of war were so abundant that three slaves were allocated to every impoverished individual. Due to the sheer number of captives, the price of slaves plummeted to unprecedented lows. Harb Jaush returned triumphantly to Jamal ad-Din, laden with booty and captives.

=== Yedaya Campaign ===
Emperor Yeshaq, alarmed by the persistent insurgency in and around Adal, responded by assembling an even larger army than before. He proceeded to invade and occupy Yedaya; however, Jamal ad-Din’s forces successfully repelled the invasion, securing a decisive victory at the 2nd Battle of Yedaya. Undeterred, the Emperor launched another offensive, capturing the district of Jazja. Nonetheless, Jamal ad-Din orchestrated a successful counteroffensive at the Battle of Jazja, decisively defeating the imperial forces and forcing them into a hasty retreat. The retreating soldiers were relentlessly pursued for three days, resulting in heavy casualties, with contemporary accounts describing the land as strewn with corpses. The victorious Adal forces subsequently razed Christian houses and churches, seizing numerous women, children, and substantial amounts of plunder. Over the course of this three-month-long expedition, the Adal army also captured one hundred saddled horses, in addition to numerous unsaddled beasts.

=== Major Campaign Against the Ethiopian Empire ===
Buoyed by his recent victories, Jamal ad-Din assembled a force larger than any fielded by his predecessors, preparing for a comprehensive assault on the Ethiopian Empire. Commanding an army that included a formidable contingent of one thousand cavalrymen, he inflicted devastating losses on Emperor Yeshaq’s forces, capturing innumerable prisoners and amassing an extensive quantity of loot. This campaign reportedly involved the largest Adalite army ever mobilized. The Emperor and the remnants of his army were forced to retreat toward the Blue Nile, pursued relentlessly by Jamal ad-Din’s forces for five months. Upon returning home, the victorious Adal troops brought with them an unimaginable quantity of spoils. Subsequently, Jamal ad-Din dispatched his brother Ahmad, accompanied by Harb Jaush, on an expedition to Dawaro, before returning home in triumph.

=== Final Expedition ===
In the latter stages of his reign, Jamal ad-Din embarked on yet another expedition, during which it was recorded that he either killed or captured virtually every individual within a twenty-day journey from his frontier. In retaliation, the Emperor’s forces launched a three-pronged assault on Adal, advancing deep into its territory and threatening the very capital where the royal family resided. Demonstrating remarkable urgency, Jamal ad-Din hastened back to the capital, covering in just three days a distance that would typically require twenty days of travel. He confronted the imperial army at Harjah, where, his forces fought well but were defeated by the Ethiopians who then took much booty from the Vanquished Adalites in their turn. According to the historian Al-Maqrizi, Emperor Yeshaq was killed during this battle. Pankhurst suspected that his death might have been deliberately omitted from the official Ethiopian chronicles, as the records of the ear often sought to obscure the violent deaths of monarchs whose reigns were otherwise glorified.

== Aftermath ==
Following Jamal ad-Din's numerous victories, the Ethiopian Empire was left reeling from the successive defeats. The Ethiopian forces, although defeated, would not remain subdued for long. Emperor Yeshaq's death marked a significant shift in the power dynamics of the region. Jamal ad-Din's successful campaigns established his rule over a vast area, forcing many regions to submit to his authority and pay tribute. His military prowess and diplomatic strategies ensured that the territories under Adal's control were fortified, and the Adal kingdom enjoyed a period of relative peace and prosperity. However, these victories also sowed the seeds for internal conflict within the Adal Empire.

Despite his triumphs, Jamal ad-Din’s rule was not without its challenges. His continuous military engagements left him vulnerable to internal dissent. Over time, his position weakened, and his once-loyal supporters began to question his leadership. Tensions among the ruling elite grew, and his cousins, became envious of his power. In the year 1432, Jamal ad-Din was assassinated, an event that marked a tumultuous period for the Adal kingdom. His death led to a brief period of instability, as rival factions vied for control of the throne. Jamal ad-Din was succeeded by his brother, Badlay ibn Sa'ad ad-Din, who assumed leadership during this critical juncture.

== Death of Jamal ad Din ==
The Adal ruler, weakened by the constant fighting, was eventually challenged by his envious cousins, who attacked and killed him around the year 1432. He was succeeded by his brother Badlay ibn Sa'ad ad-Din.
