= Battle of Zeila (1410) =

- Part of the Abyssinian-Ifat conflict
Date	1410
Location	Zeila, Ifat Sultanate (Modern day Somaliland)
Result	Ethiopian victory: Zeila sacked and completely destroyed; Fall and Collapse of the Ifat Sultanate; Remaining members of the Walashma Dynasty flees to Yemen
Territorial changes	Fall of the Ifat Sultanate with its territories annexed by the Ethiopian Empire

Belligerents
Ethiopian Empire	Ifat Sultanate

Commanders and leaders
Dawit I	Sa'ad ad-Din II †

Strength
Unknown	Unknown

Casualties and losses
Unknown	Entire army

The Battle of Zeila in 1410 was a decisive battle where Emperor Dawit I of the Ethiopian Empire defeated the Ifat Sultanate, leading to its collapse and the death of Sultan Sa'ad ad-Din II. This event paved the way for the rise of the Adal Sultanate, following the return of Sabr ad din's return from Yemen following his flight.

== Background ==
During the reign of Sa'ad ad-Din II, He and his brother Haqq ad-Din II revolted against the Ethiopian emperor and moved their capital to Adal which was outside the sphere of Abyssinian control in the Harar plateau. Pankhurst adds that Sa'ad ad-Din also fought against the kingdom of the Hadiya and a pastoral people called the Zalan, both of whom were Christian allies. However, as Taddesse Tamrat notes, these successes were short-lived, and in response to the growing Muslim power in the region Emperor Dawit I strengthened the Ethiopian defenses along the border and established his court at Tilq in Fatagar.

== Battle and Aftermath ==
Despite these steps, Sa'ad ad-Din's practice of making quick raids into Ethiopian territory presented a difficult challenge to the Ethiopian Emperor, there were several fights between the Abyssinians and it was not until the Sultan was pursued deep into Ifat territory that the Ethiopians would face him on in a pitched battle. After a battle between Sa'ad ad-Din and the Ethiopian general Barwa, in which the Ifat army was defeated and "no less than 400 elders, each of whom carried an iron bar as his insignia of office" were killed, Sa'ad ad-Din with his remaining supporters were chased to furthest part of Zeila
