= Jamal ad-Din II =

3rd Sultan of the Sultanate of Adal

Jamal ad-Din II جمال الدين الثاني
- Sultan

Sultan of the Adal Sultanate
- Reign: 1424-1433
- Predecessor: Mansur ad-Din of Adal
- Successor: Badlay ibn Sa'ad ad-Din
- Died: 1433
Names
- Jamal ad-Din Ibn Sa'ad ad-Din
- Dynasty: Walashma dynasty
- Religion: Islam

Jamal ad-Din II (Arabic: جمال الدين الثاني) (died 1433) was a Sultan of the Adal Sultanate. He was the youngest son of Sa'ad ad-Din II.

== Reign ==
Mansur was succeeded in 1424 by his youngest brother, Sultan Jamal ad-Din Muhammad. Jamal ad-Din then reorganized the army into a formidable force. He had the support of the aforementioned defector Harb Jaush who had proven himself by then as a loyal outstanding commander. Jamal ad-Din, as a wise and able ruler dispatched this chief as an envoy to Emperor Yeshaq in an attempt to arrange a compromise peace, but negotiations failed. A battle then ensued, in which Jamal ad-Din's forces and Harb Jaush fought with the Emperor's men, who reportedly included 7,000 archers and swordsmen. The Ethiopians were put to flight and later submitted, and agreed to pay him tribute with some even accepting Jamal ad-Din's rule.

After the precedent military success of Harb Jaush against the Ethiopians, Jamal ad-Din again sent the former on an expedition to Bali where he was said to have killed and crushed the inhabitants of the region. He also carried away many captives and he obtained so much booty that three slaves were given to every poor man. Moreover, because of the multitude of these, every slave was sold at the lowest price, he returned victorious to Jamal ad-Din.

Yeshaq, disturbed by the continuing insurgency in and around Adal responded by collecting an even bigger army than before invaded and occupied Yedaya, but Jamal ad-Din again repulsed him and beat him at the 2nd Battle of Yedaya. The Emperor then invaded and captured the district of Jazja, but Jamal ad-Din successfully counter attacked and defeated them at the Battle of Jazja forcing the imperial soldiers to flee. They were subsequently pursued for three days and suffered so many casualties that the land was reported to be strewn with corpses. The victorious Adal troops then burnt the houses and churches of the Christians and carried off a number of their women and children, besides much booty. In the course of this expedition, which lasted three months, the victors also captured a hundred saddled horses besides numerous beasts without saddles.

Following this success the Adal king collected a larger force than any of his predecessors and then organized another major attack on the Emperor's army. Making use of a thousand horseman he killed numbers of Yeshaq's soldiers, took innumerable prisoners and seized an extensive amount of loot and inflicted heavy casualties in what was reportedly the largest Adalite army ever fielded. The Emperor and the remainder of his followers were forced to flee to the Blue Nile, with Jamal's troops in hot pursuit for five months, after which their commander returned home with so much loot that it was impossible to describe. He then sent his brother Ahmad with Harb Jaush, on an expedition to Dawaro before returning home triumphantly.

Jamal ad-Din later undertook a further expedition in which it is recorded that he killed or took prisoners of everyone within twenty-days journey of his frontier. The Emperor's forces countered by attacking three different parts of Adal and threatening its capital where the royal family resided. Jamal ad-Din rushed home covering the distance of what was twenty days of journey in only three days. He met the imperial army at Harjah, where Yeshaq's army, though exhausted, fought well but was eventually defeated. The Emperor Yeshaq according to Maqrizi was killed in this battle. His death like that of Dawit, is not recorded for the same reason that the royal Ethiopian chronicles suppressed the violent deaths of their kings whose reigns they extolled.

Jamal ad-Din also enjoyed a considerable reputation for justice. As a story Maqrizi relates shows:

On one occasion when his children were small, one of them while playing is said to have struck a child smaller than himself, and broke his hand. The sultan did not hear of this until some time afterwards. When he did he was furious that his courtiers had concealed the matter from him. He summoned the injured family, and calling together his subjects, ordered his son to be brought before him, as someone deserving punishment on the Biblical principle of "an eye for an eye, a tooth for a tooth". The leading courtiers begged him to show mercy, and the child's family declared that it had no desire for revenge. The stern ruler, however was not to be moved to clemency. When his son came forward to suffer the penalty, all the bystanders bewailed loudly, and the injured child's family reiterated that they were in favour of mercy. Jamal ad-Din, however seized his son's hand, and broke it with the blow of an iron bar. The boy cried out in pain and all the present lamented his hard lot, but the sultan merely said to his son, "Feel now yourself what you made the other boy feel!"

After such acts of severity it's perhaps not surprising that Jamal ad-Din's subjects are said to have adhered strictly to the law. In which Maqrizi remarks that they dared not touch the possessions of others, and that no one, whether they were of nobility or common birth, did ill to others. Everyone feared their ruler so much so that no one was indifferent to his commands or prohibitions. Thus Jamal Ad-Din was respected for the severity of his rule, the force of his punishments, and the excellence of his virtues.

== Death ==
The Adals ruler weakened by constant fighting within a few years he was challenged by his envious cousins who attacked and killed him, around year 1432. He was succeeded by his brother Badlay ibn Sa'ad ad-Din.

== See also ==
- Walashma dynasty
- Jamal ad-Din I

== Notes ==
Preceded by Mansur ad-Din	Walashma dynasty	Succeeded by Badlay ibn Sa'ad ad-Din
