= Mansur ad-Din of Adal =

2nd Sultan of the Sultanate of Adal

Mansur ad-Din منصور الدين
- Sultan

Sultan of the Adal Sultanate
- Reign: 1422/23-1424
- Predecessor: Sabr ad-Din III
- Successor: Jamal ad-Din II
- Died: 1424
- Dynasty: Walashma dynasty
- Religion: Islam

Mansur ad-Din (Arabic: منصور الدين) (died 1424) was a Sultan of the Adal Sultanate. He was the son of Sa'ad ad-Din II.

== Reign ==
After his reconquest of Adal, Sabr ad-Din III died of natural causes in 1422. Sultan Mansur succeeded the throne and enjoyed the support of his brother Muhammad.

Early in his reign he launched an expedition against an Ethiopian Christian monarch, Emperor Dawit I and drove him to Yedaya which was described as his royal seat, destroyed the Solomonic army, where according to Maqrizi, Dawit was captured and killed. His death however presumed to be an event of major importance, is not recorded by the Ethiopian Chronicles. The Ethiopian historian Taddesse Tamrat argues it's because the Ethiopian royal chronicles often deliberately attempted to suppress the violent deaths of the kings whose reigns they extol.

=== Siege of Mukha ===
He then advanced to Mukha mountain (or Moha), where 30,000 imperial soldiers were besieged for two months in 1493. Mansur ad-Din was victorious. The soldiers were given the choice of either embracing Islam or returning home, of which about 10,000 were said to have converted to Islam, while the remainder returned home.

== Death ==
Soon after this the fortunes of war again changed. In 1424 another Christian monarch, Emperor Yeshaq I, set forth with a huge army which Maqrizi likens to a swarm of locusts. The Christian troops were also trained by fugitive Mamluk who taught them the secrets of Greek fire. Mansur and his brother Muhammad were captured, and their brother Jamal ad-Din succeeded them on the throne immediately afterwards.

== See also ==
- Walashma dynasty

== Notes ==
Preceded by Sabr ad-Din II	Walashma dynasty	Succeeded by Jamal ad-Din II
