= Sabr ad-Din III =

Sabr ad-Din III الصبر الدين الثالث
- Sultan

Sultan of the Adal Sultanate
- Reign: 1415–1422/23
- Predecessor: Sa'ad ad-Din II
- Successor: Mansur ad-Din
- Died: 1422 or 1423
Names
- Sabr ad-Din III
- Dynasty: Walashma dynasty
- Religion: Islam

Sabr ad-Din III (Arabic: الصبر الدين الثالث) (died 1422 or 1423) was a Somali Sultan of the Adal Sultanate and the oldest son of Sa'ad ad-Din II. Sabr ad-Din returned back to the Horn of Africa to reclaim his father's realm. He defeated the Ethiopians and proclaimed himself "King of Adal". He subsequently became the first ruler and founder of the new Adal dynasty.

== Reign ==
After their father was defeated in 1409, Sabr ad-Din and his brothers fled to Yemen, to the Rasulid court at Ta'izz, where they were received by Sultan al-Malik al-Nasir. It is probable that they joined their uncle there. In 1412 he returned from Arabia with ten horsemen, as well as military supplies provided by his family's patron Nasir Ahmad. Sabr ad-Din and his brothers made their way to the city of Siyara, where they were joined by a number of their father's former followers.

Even though they were outnumbered by the soldiers of the Christian state, they fought several successful battles against the forces of Emperor Dawit I.

=== Battle of Zikr Amhara ===
In 1413, Sabr ad-Din first fought the Ethiopians at Zikr Amhara (Memory of the Amhara). Though outnumbered, the Adalites won the battle, and the reconquest of Adal began.

=== Battle of Serjan ===
After Zikr Amhara, Sabr ad-Din proceeded to the district of Serjan, where he fought the Ethiopians again in 1413. Though outnumbered, the Adalites won the battle. Scattering their enemies, they burned many houses and churches and took a large amount of booty in gold and other valuables. Adal then took control of the district.

=== Later campaigns ===
Such destruction and opposition on the eastern borders angered the Christian rulers of the empire. An unnamed commander with ten chiefs, in charge of 20,000 men, moved into area for a year hoping to restore the lost "Amhara rule". This caused Sabr Ad-din and his followers to flee and endure hunger, thirst and other deprivations.

The Muslims forces later regained their strength. Sabr ad-Din was able to send his brother Muhammad with Harb Jaush, a defector from the Christian side, to attack the imperial forces. The Emperor's commander and many other Christian leaders fell at the Battle of Retwa and their soldiers were killed, except for a few of them who managed to escape. Sabr ad-Din seized a considerable amount of booty, then subsequently ruled the district for some time. He later proceeded towards the Emperor's headquarters, where the Battle of Adal was fought in which many Christian nobles fell, after which Sabr ad-Din put their headquarters up in flames.

Victorious the King then returned to his capital, but gave the order to his many followers to continue and extend the war. He entrusted his brother Muhammad with the task of capturing a fort at Barut and then instructed one of his commanders, Omar to raid the land of Jab. This was so well defended by the imperial forces as by their sheer number as Maqrizi relates as "numerous as locusts", Omar's men were all killed by spears. Sabr Ad-Din was almost captured but escaped because of the speed of his horse.

In 1436 Ibn Taghribirdi wrote a passage about the death of Emperor Yeshaq, stating, "The Hatse, the Abyssinian king, the infidel and the Lord of the Amhara in Abyssinia died (in this year). His estates were much enlarged after wars waged and led by him against Sultan Sa'ad ad-Din, the Lord of the Jabart." Sabr-ad-Din died of natural causes, in either 1422 or 1423

== See also ==
- Sabr ad-Din I
- Walashma dynasty

== Notes ==
Preceded by Sa'ad ad-Din II	Walashma dynasty	Succeeded by Mansur ad-Din
