= Sa'ad ad-Din II =

Sa'ad ad-Din II سعد الدين الثاني
- Sultan of the Sultanate of Ifat; Lord of Jabarta
- Reign: 1386/7 – 1402/3 or 1410 CE (788 – 805 or 817 AH)
- Predecessor: Haqq ad-Din II
- Successor: Sabr ad-Din III
- Died: 1403 or 1410; Zeila Archipelago
Names
- Sa'ad ad-Din II
- Dynasty: Walashma dynasty
- Religion: Islam

Sa'ad ad-Din II (Arabic: سعد الدين الثاني), reigned c. 1386 – c. 1403 or c. 1410, was a Sultan of the Ifat Sultanate. He was the brother of Haqq ad-Din II, and the father of Mansur ad-Din, Sabr ad-Din II and Badlay ibn Sa'ad ad-Din. The historian Richard Pankhurst describes him as "the last great ruler of Ifat."

== Reign ==
Sa'ad ad-Din II was born at the court of the Ethiopian Emperor Newaya Krestos. He and his brother Haqq ad-Din II revolted against the Ethiopian Emperor and moved their capital to Adal which was outside the sphere of Abyssinian control in the Harar plateau. Pankhurst adds that Sa'ad ad-Din also fought against the kingdom of the Hadiya and a pastoral people called the Zalan, both of whom were Christian allies. However, as Taddesse Tamrat notes, these successes were short-lived, and in response to the growing Muslim power in the region Emperor Dawit I strengthened the Ethiopian defenses along the border and established his court at Tilq in Fatagar.

Despite these steps, Sa'ad ad-Din's practice of making quick raids into Ethiopian territory presented a difficult challenge to the Ethiopian Emperor, there were several fights between the Abyssinians and it was not until the Sultan was pursued deep into Ifat territory that the Ethiopians would face him on in a pitched battle. After a battle between Sa'ad ad-Din and the Ethiopian general Barwa, in which the Ifat army was defeated and "no less than 400 elders, each of whom carried an iron bar as his insignia of office" were killed, Sa'ad ad-Din with his remaining supporters were chased to furthest part of Zeila There, the Ethiopian army besieged Zeila, finally capturing the city and killing Sultan Sa'ad ad-Din on the island, Medieval Egyptian historian Al-Maqrizi narrates:

the Amhara pursued Sa'd al-Din as far as the peninsula of Zeila, in the ocean, where he took refuge. The Amhara besieged him there, and deprived him of water; at last one of the impious showed them a way by which they could reach him. When they came upon him a battle ensued; and after three days the water failed. Sa'd al Din was wounded in the forehead and fell to the ground, whereupon they pierced him with their swords. But he died happily, falling in God's cause.

With Sa'ad ad-Din's death, the Walashma dynasty adopted the title of "kings of Adal". His ten sons took refuge in Yemen at the court of King Ahmad bin al-Ashraf.

== Legacy ==
Sa'ad ad-Din's tomb stood as a hallowed site for centuries in Zeila. It was visited by Richard Burton the explorer in 1854, who described it as "a mound of rough stones surrounding an upright pole" near the cemetery, decorated with "the remains of votive banquets, broken stones, dried garbage, and stones blackened by the fire" showing how he was "properly venerated" as the current favorite saint of Zeila. Trimingham notes that at the time he wrote his book (circa 1950), the tomb had been destroyed by the encroaching sea.

Additionally, the Saad ad-Din Islands in northern Somalia, off the coast of Zeila, are named in Sa'ad ad-Din's honour.

According to the chronicle "Conquest of Abyssinia" by Arab Faqīh, Harla clans descendant from Sa'ad ad-Din II participated in the sixteenth century Ethiopian–Adal War.

Adal occasionally maintained its designation as Barr Sa'daddīn among the fanatic regional authorities in recognition of his struggle with neighboring Abyssinia, as documented in the historical records of the Emirate of Harar during the eighteenth century:

the outstanding person under the famous and glorious emirs, to whom thanks are given in all places, who is praised in every language, our Master who trust in the gracious God, Sultan "Abdaššakūr b. Yösuf al-'Afif, to whom God the Almighty may give descendants of high rank and might, so that the institutions of the Muslim community will be strengthened by mighty kings and sultans, [our Master,] the crown under the leaders of Barr Sa'daddīn,' the cutter of the heads of the polytheists, the architect of the building of justice and religion, the eraser of the unbelievers and the tyrants,

== See also ==
- Walashma dynasty

=== Works cited ===
- Cerulli, Enrico (1931). "Documenti arabi per la storia dell'Etiopia". Memorie della Reale Accademia Nazionale dei Lincei. 6 (4): 39–101. OCLC 4178469.

== Notes ==
| Preceded by Haqq ad-Din II | Walashma dynasty | Succeeded by Sabr ad-Din II |
