= Rebellion of Yeshaq =

1561–1567 revolt in the Ethiopian Empire

Date	1561–1567 (Note: According to Merid Wolde Aregay and Abir, Yeshaq's submission to Sarsa Dengel took place in 1567; according to Girma Beshah and Merid Wolde Aregay and Cengiz Orhonlu, in 1568; Denis Nosnitsin dates it to 1571. The sources describe two separate events: first, the peace made near the Abbay river after the defeat of Fasilo (Conti Rossini dates it to the summer of 1567, and Nosnitsin elsewhere also to 1567), and a later meeting on the Angareb river in 1571–1572, at which Yeshaq and Harbo submitted to the emperor.)
Location	Tigray, Begemder, Gojjam and the coast of the Red Sea
Result	See Reconciliation

Belligerents
Ethiopian Empire	Forces of Yeshaq and allied nobles; Ethio-Portuguese soldiers; Ottoman Empire (1562–1563)

Commanders and leaders
Minas; Sarsa Dengel; Zarʾa Yoḥannes	Yeshaq; Keflo; Harbo; Francisco Jácome; "Zemur" Pasha (Note: The date of Özdemir's death in Ottoman sources is 1560; his son Osman was appointed governor of Habesh around the end of 1561. Orhonlu and Şahin Allahverdi consider that Ethiopian sources confused Osman with his father, naming him "Zemur". According to Emeri van Donzel, Özdemir died in 1559. Merid Wolde Aregay, relying on the letters of the Jesuit missionaries of 1562 and 1564, holds that the elder Özdemir was still alive in 1562, and Abir follows the same chronology. In the letters of the Jesuits, the death of "Zemur" occurred only after the death of Minas, and the monk Pawlos also dates it to the Ethiopian year corresponding to 1562–1563.)

The rebellion of Yeshaq was a revolt in the Ethiopian Empire from 1561 to 1567, led by Yeshaq, the Bahr Negash or governor of the northern maritime province, against the emperors Minas and Sarsa Dengel. It began as a conspiracy of nobles to replace Minas with his nephew Tazkaro and became the first of the civil wars that divided the empire in the 1560s. After his defeat in 1561 Yeshaq allied with the Ottoman governor of Habesh, bringing Ottoman troops onto the Ethiopian highlands, and under his protection the Jesuit mission established itself at Fremona.

Yeshaq, who had fought against Ahmad Gragn and the Ottomans, was deprived of his governorship shortly after the accession of Minas in 1559, as part of the new emperor's efforts to limit the powers of the great provincial lords. Minas's enmity toward Catholicism also estranged the Jesuit bishop Andrés de Oviedo and many of the Ethio-Portuguese, the descendants of Portuguese soldiers who had settled in Ethiopia, and Oviedo promised the conspirators that he would bring them soldiers from Portuguese India. In 1561 Yeshaq left for the north and Tazkaro was proclaimed emperor by Keflo and other nobles. Minas chased Yeshaq, defeated him at Adyabo in Shire, and then turned south and defeated the party of Tazkaro in Begemder in July 1561.

When no Portuguese help came, Yeshaq made a pact with the Ottoman pasha in January 1562, gave him a base at Debarwa and proclaimed Tazkaro's younger brother Marqos emperor. In April 1562 the allies defeated Minas at Enderta. Minas died in January 1563 while preparing a new campaign. Under Minas's son Sarsa Dengel, Yeshaq briefly joined the revolt of the powerful lord Hamalmal, but lost his candidate for the throne when Hamalmal surrendered in 1564 and handed Marqos over to the emperor. His alliance with the Ottomans also broke down, and he drove them back to the coast. He made peace in 1567 and was confirmed as Bahr Negash with considerable autonomy but rebelled again in the 1570s and was killed at the Battle of Addi Qarro in 1578. The rebellion is usually seen as a struggle for central power between the crown and the nobility rather than as a separatist movement, and Ottoman support for Yeshaq turned it from a brief revolt into a prolonged war.

== Background ==
=== Yeshaq ===
Yeshaq was a Tigrayan, son of Dagana, the head of the family governing Shire, and he was probably born at the beginning of the 16th century. Land grants of 1531 list him as an azaj at the court of Lebna Dengel, and the same year, with the rank of azmach that he retained throughout his life, he was one of the three commanders of the army that relieved Amba Geshen; a later grant mentions him as one of the two behtwadad, the highest office in the kingdom. Little else is known of his early life. His father Dagana went over to Ahmad during the invasion and was later reconciled with Gelawdewos, but Yeshaq was one of the very few lords who refused to submit to the imam. The annals of Addi Neammin in Hamasien call him "Yeshaq, son of Dagana". During the rainy season of 1539, Lebna Dengel took refuge from Ahmad Gragn and his army in the mountains of Shire, most likely with the help of Yeshaq, and Yeshaq was rewarded with the office of Bahr Negash. In 1541, Yeshaq met the Portuguese fleet of Estêvão da Gama at Massawa and informed him of the condition of the Christian kingdom, which resulted in da Gama sending a contingent of about 400 soldiers led by Cristóvão da Gama. Yeshaq aided the Portuguese force in crossing the highlands and gained recognition among them as a hero of Ethiopia. He fought at the Battle of Wayna Daga in February 1543. In 1549 he added the governorship of Tigray to his own province, and although he was recalled to court in 1552, he later returned to the north, where he took particular care to control the routes to the coast, kept close ties with the Portuguese and built up his strength with firearms. Gelawdewos also entrusted him with the guardianship of the children of his deceased brother Yaʿeqob. A charter of 1557 calls him azmach of Aksum, giving him control of both the sacred city and the trade routes to the Red Sea. When Oviedo landed in March 1557, Yeshaq met him on the road and escorted him to his residence at Debarwa, the capital of the Bahr Negash, which lay on the main trade route between the interior and Massawa, three days' march from the port. He then went ahead to the court, where he was one of the two officers who brought the bishop before Gelawdewos.

Some historians attribute the strength of Yeshaq, and the increasing independence of the Bahr Negash, to firearms imported through the coast of the Red Sea. Merid Wolde Aregay is more restrained, arguing that until the 17th century firearms were acquired almost exclusively by the emperors, although Yeshaq might have obtained some from his Ottoman allies. Yeshaq's family came from Shire, and his main rivals in Tigray were the house of Bora and Salawa, to which Minas's father-in-law Robel belonged.

=== Minas ===
Minas was a son of Emperor Lebna Dengel and Empress Sabla Wangel. He was captured in Wag on 10 May 1539, during Ahmad's invasion. Ahmad and his wife Bati del Wambara planned to marry him to their daughter, but on the advice of his counselors Ahmad instead sent him as a present to the Ottoman pasha at Zabid, whose help he needed against the newly arrived Portuguese. He was exchanged at sea off Massawa for Ahmad's captured son around the end of 1544. Minas married Sellus Hayla, the daughter of the Tigrayan governor Robel. He was widely suspected of having become a Muslim in captivity, and this embarrassment, together with the irritable temper his captivity seems to have left him, may have contributed to the disaffection of some nobles. (Note: Kropp and Kleiner suggest that the planned marriage to Ahmad's daughter presupposes that Minas became a Muslim. The Jesuits wrote in 1562 that Minas had become a Muslim; in his History of Ethiopia of the 1620s Pedro Páez accepted this and explained Minas's severity by his years among the Turks. In his thesis Merid Wolde Aregay rejected the Jesuits' claims that Minas was secretly a Muslim and persecuted Catholics on this basis, as Abir does too, but afterward wrote that the allegation of Minas's conversion was "most probably true"; however, as he stated, it was no obstacle to his accession to the throne, since most of Minas's enemies had themselves apostatized during the invasion. The chronicle of Minas is silent about his temper.) The Portuguese soldiers did not hide their contempt for a prince who, as they believed, had turned Muslim when he could have died a martyr.

When Gelawdewos was killed fighting Nur ibn Mujahid in 1559, Minas was proclaimed emperor at Mangesta Samayat in Gojjam, taking the throne name Admas Sagad. (Note: The chronicle of Minas is the third of the three introductory chapters of the chronicle of Sarsa Dengel and the only detailed account of the reign of Minas in Ethiopian sources. Kropp describes its author as a partisan of the royal family who "writes no untruths, but leaves out important things". In this article quotations from it are translated from Kropp's German translation. Páez also translated a version of this text in his History of Ethiopia. According to Conti Rossini, the author of the chronicle of Sarsa Dengel was a churchman attached to the royal house. The chronicle of Sarsa Dengel was partly rewritten during the reign of Susenyos, and in one of the manuscripts the pages concerning Minas's reign stand on a separate quire in another handwriting; as Kropp suggests, this means that the account of Minas could also have been rewritten, and its earlier version could survive in some unstudied manuscript. The abridged chronicle gives only a few lines to these years.) He and his mother had gone there from Waj instead of facing Nur, a retreat that Merid Wolde Aregay regards as a blow to the morale of the army and the nobility. One of his first acts was to make his cousin Hamalmal dajazmach of the lands beyond the Abbay, with the task of fighting Nur, while the court moved to Dembiya for the rainy season. The only important absentee from his coronation was Yeshaq, who was in Debarwa watching the Ottomans and had probably not yet heard the news. He was not consulted about the succession, but the new emperor's supporters did not yet dare to challenge him, and he and his father kept their governorships.

=== The Ottomans in Habesh ===
The Ottoman province of Habesh was created in 1555 under Özdemir Pasha, who took Massawa, Arqiqo and Dahlak in 1556–1557. In April 1557 Özdemir marched inland from Massawa with about 100 horsemen and 400 infantry. In a mountain pass on the road to Debarwa he defeated the forces of the Bahr Negash, killing Yeshaq's brother ʿAggabā, himself a former Bahr Negash, and went on to occupy Debarwa. Gelawdewos then sent an army under Yeshaq that surrounded the Turks there and drove Özdemir back to the coast. The Jesuits wrote that the Turks had taken many captives but were driven out with the loss of almost all their men and much of their gold and goods. Yeshaq then left the Ottomans in control of Massawa, possibly because they were willing to sell him firearms and buy the slaves he could supply. The Ottomans retook Debarwa in 1559, building a wall, a tower and a mosque there, but withdrew to the coast after Özdemir fell ill, and the Ethiopians destroyed their buildings. A truce then came: in March 1560 a Portuguese squadron was informed at Arqiqo that the emperor and the ruler of Massawa had opened the coast to trade for three years, in order to restore a seaboard devastated by war. Yeshaq's good relations with the sultan of Dahlak, who later mediated his treaty with the pasha, may have arisen from a customs agreement concluded at this time. The province was poor and weakly held; its officers were often paid from the treasury of Egypt, and Ottoman domination in much of the region was largely nominal.

In 1560 a small Portuguese squadron sailed to Massawa escorting the Jesuit Fulgêncio Freire, who was captured and taken to Cairo. Fearing a larger Portuguese landing, the Ottoman commander came from Suakin to Arqiqo and stayed there, where he could follow the turmoil in the interior. According to Freire, the pasha had about a hundred horsemen and many foot soldiers, and kept to the coast because he was afraid of losing his head for his previous defeat in Ethiopia.

=== Minas and the nobility ===
Shortly after Minas's accession, his chronicler writes, "great men of the realm, like Keflo and others" started to grumble in secret "until they showed it openly in deeds". Keflo had himself sent word of Gelawdewos's death to the queen mother and proposed that Minas be made emperor. After the rainy season of 1559 Minas called up troops from all his provinces, including Yeshaq, for a campaign against the Beta Israel of Semien, which achieved nothing and was abandoned on the advice of the clergy. A merchant from the royal camp reported at Arqiqo that the Beta Israel had offered to go on paying their tribute, but that Minas demanded their conversion, which they refused. Couto reports that the emperor gave up after suffering heavy losses in trying to capture the mountain strongholds, and Yeshaq's own troops left many dead behind. In March 1560 Yeshaq was summoned to the emperor with all the men he could raise, leaving his son in command at Debarwa. Yeshaq and his father Dagana, the governor of Tigray, were detained in the royal camp and dismissed, and their provinces were given to rival Tigrayan families tied to the emperor by marriage. Zarʾa Yoḥannes succeeded Dagana as Tigre Mekonnen, and Yeshaq was instead given the title of nebura'ed of Aksum, an honorary dignity with little military importance. (Note: Nosnitsin, relying on the autobiography of the monk Pawlos, states that Zarʾa Yoḥannes was appointed instead of Yeshaq, and may have held both the offices of Tigre Mekonnen and Bahr Negash. He notes that the chronicle of Minas does not mention the dismissal at all.)

The dismissals were part of Minas's effort to concentrate power in his hands and break the great provincial lords, and there is no indication that Yeshaq intended to betray the emperor before he lost his governorship. Minas also appointed several young men to court offices that had fallen vacant, and the companions of Gelawdewos who still governed provinces feared that they would be dismissed or have their power curtailed. Merid Wolde Aregay suspects that Sabla Wangel, who had been on bad terms with Gelawdewos and his ministers, was behind the changes, and Abir notes that most of her supporters were Shewan and Amhara.

In the second year of his reign a man named Balaw Raʿad and his servant entered the emperor's tent at night and twice threw a spear at him while he was asleep; both were eventually caught and executed, one by hanging and the other by stoning. Dismissed nobles were probably behind the attempt, and Minas lost the chance to identify them by having the men executed before they were questioned.

Later writers blamed the emperor's manner as well as his policy. The Jesuit historian Manuel de Almeida, writing in the 17th century, states that Minas was widely disliked and that the revolts of his reign were caused by his ill temper and intemperate speech; it was alleged that during his captivity he had learned the habit of insulting his servants and vassals, and that he still abused them in Turkish and Arabic. The chronicle of Susenyos says much the same, noting that the nobles set up his nephew against him owing to his untimely wrath.

=== Minas and the Catholics ===
What had originally been projected in the 1550s as an ambitious patriarchate had been scaled back to three fathers and two lay brothers in Tigray by Minas's time, with the patriarch João Nunes Barreto still waiting in Goa, where he eventually died in 1562. Minas revoked the liberties granted to the Catholics by Gelawdewos, prohibited Ethiopians from attending Portuguese churches, and confiscated lands owned by some Portuguese. According to an unpublished account by Páez, Minas was at first not hostile to the Catholics: Oviedo could easily reach him, and the emperor himself organized debates between the Jesuits and the Ethiopian clergy. The debates evolved into verbal abuse. According to Couto, after an argument about circumcision, Minas told the bishop that he was circumcised "for cleanliness", to which Oviedo retorted, "With this cleanliness you shall go to hell", and Minas thereafter closed his court to the Portuguese. In 1562 the Jesuits complained that he blamed the death of his brother on the toleration of the Roman faith, that he had detained Oviedo for six months or more, and that he threatened to burn the other fathers alive.

According to Almeida, who drew on testimonies collected for an inquiry into Oviedo's life, Minas summoned the bishop and ordered him to stop teaching his doctrine to Ethiopians; when Oviedo refused, the emperor drew his sword and then ripped the bishop's clothes before the empress and the nobles stepped in, and he banished him to a mountain with another Jesuit, where they lived in a hut for six or seven months. Almeida further notes that what mainly irritated the emperor was that the lords who rose against him always expected soldiers from India and had most of the Portuguese in Ethiopia as their partisans. Bishop Oviedo responded with public insults and preached openly that the Portuguese should not serve a "heretic" emperor. Before leaving Goa he and Barreto had asked in vain for an escort of at least 500 soldiers. Merid Wolde Aregay believes that these provocations were intentional, as Oviedo had convinced himself that the union of the churches could be achieved only by force and hoped that an anti-Portuguese reaction would prompt the Portuguese crown to intervene. He later wrote that Oviedo "capitalized" on the Portuguese soldiers' horror at Minas's supposed apostasy and took them to join Yeshaq, "the leader of the opposition to Minas". The Ethio-Portuguese were the surviving soldiers of Cristóvão da Gama's expedition and their descendants, who had settled in the country. There were about 1,200 of them in the mid-1550s, and from 1559 they were led by Francisco Jácome; they now split between those who followed the emperor and those who followed Yeshaq.

== Revolt against Minas (1561) ==
=== Conspiracy ===
Early in 1561 Minas left for Lasta and Angot. In his absence the conspirators agreed to raise up as emperor Tazkaro, the eldest son of Yaʿeqob, arguing that he had a better claim because his father had been older than Minas. (Note: Merid Wolde Aregay, Girma Beshah and the Jesuit letters of 1562 and 1563 state that Yaʿeqob was older than Minas, whereas Kleiner regards Yaʿeqob as Minas's younger brother. Merid Wolde Aregay notes that, according to the traditional rules of succession, Minas had as much right to the throne as Yaʿeqob's sons.) The Jesuits dated the revolt to the end of 1560 and described Tazkaro as a bastard son of Yaʿeqob. (Note: The annals of Addi Neammin record in the year 213 of the Era of Mercy (1560–1561) only that "Yeshaq revolted". Their editor notes that according to the Liber Axumae, which names Tazkaro, the revolt took place a year earlier, a date he considers erroneous. The abridged chronicle records the proclamation of Tazkaro in the second year of the reign, and according to Pawlos, Tazkaro "reigned" in the Year of Mercy 213 and stayed in Begemder.) Its leaders were Yeshaq; Keflo, a brother-in-law of Sabla Wangel and governor of Dembiya; and Yoḥannes, who was a cousin of the emperor and brother of Hamalmal. According to Couto, the conspirators withdrew from the court in fear of being discovered and chose Yeshaq as their leader. The chronicler of Sarsa Dengel later recalled that "Tazkāro reigned by the decision of Kǝflo and Yǝsḥaq".

Most of the Jesuits in Ethiopia had come to believe that only a military intervention from Goa could replace Minas with a ruler friendly to Catholicism. Oviedo promised the conspirators that the Portuguese governor of India would send soldiers, and Francisco Jácome joined Tazkaro's party with about twenty to thirty men. Couto says that the bishop and the fathers favored the plot "as much as they could, but in great secrecy", and the Jesuits themselves wrote in 1562 that the strongest reason for the Portuguese to join the rebels "cannot be told here". In return the conspirators pledged their support for Catholicism, and Tazkaro was to recognize Barreto as patriarch of Ethiopia if Minas were overthrown. Yeshaq had long cultivated the Catholic clergy and let Oviedo believe that he was inclined to the Roman faith, although he never adopted it. Yeshaq and Oviedo were expecting the arrival of the soldiers in April 1561, and the conspirators planned to wait for them before making their revolt public. In Goa, Bishop Melchior Carneiro learned from letters and from an Ethiopian messenger that the Bahr Negash wished to give obedience to Rome and, as the governor of the coast, could bring the mission into the country if it were given two ships; the viceroy agreed to provide them. No larger force could be provided: Portuguese patrolling in the Red Sea had largely ceased, the Ottomans dominated the ports, and the Jesuits in Ethiopia were almost completely isolated from India.

The chronicle of Minas says that when the emperor left his rainy-season quarters for Warwar, the district around Lalibela, Yeshaq stayed behind claiming to be ill, and Keflo claimed he had to arrange his daughter's wedding, so that they could proclaim Tazkaro. Becoming suspicious, Minas repeatedly ordered Yeshaq to come to him. Yeshaq set out with the messengers, but at a fork in the road he sent them ahead, saying he would take another road where his followers could find food, and turned back to his own land, where he gathered his sons, kinsmen and followers. Keflo and the others then proclaimed Tazkaro emperor. The Jesuits wrote instead that Yeshaq was on the coast on business for Tazkaro, and believed that he hoped to meet the soldiers Oviedo had promised. He may also have gone north to divide the emperor's forces or to raise a revolt in Tigray.

=== Battle of Adyabo ===
Rather than march against Tazkaro's party first, Minas decided to strike Yeshaq, whom his chronicler calls "the foundation of the edifice of wickedness". The Jesuits described Yeshaq as "a very notable person in matters of war" and the enemy whom the emperor "most feared", and wrote that Minas's main reason for heading toward the coast was his fear that Portuguese troops would arrive from India and that Yeshaq would bring them over to Tazkaro. Minas sent Zarʾa Yoḥannes ahead with a large force; in his haste the commander seized the mules, belongings and gold of three Jesuits traveling ahead of the army. Yeshaq moved to attack Zarʾa Yoḥannes, believing him to be alone, but when he learned that the emperor was close behind he fled to Shire. Minas caught him in the land of Adyabo, the westernmost district of Shire, just south of the Mareb River, where Yeshaq turned and gave battle. (Note: Girma Beshah and Merid Wolde Aregay also locate the battle at "Adiabo, in Tigre". Pankhurst, following Bruce, says that it took place at Dambaguina. Orhonlu and Şahin Allahverdi locate the defeat of Yeshaq at "Wagara" in July 1561, which seems to combine it with the later battle with Tazkaro. According to the Jesuits, Yeshaq drove the emperor away in an earlier battle before being defeated in the second battle, and Conti Rossini also describes two battles with Yeshaq, dating the second to 2 July 1561 and combining it with the capture of Tazkaro.) (Note: Nosnitsin writes that Zarʾa Yoḥannes pursued and defeated Yeshaq, and that Minas afterward pardoned and probably reinstated him. In the chronicle Zarʾa Yoḥannes only heads the vanguard, Minas fights in the battle himself, and the person pardoned is Yeshaq's cousin ʿAggabā. However, according to Bruce, Yeshaq attacked and routed the force of Zarʾa Yoḥannes.)

The emperor won, and one of Yeshaq's sons was killed in the fighting, a detail also recorded by the monk Pawlos; Pedro Páez's version of the chronicle adds that another son was captured. Some of his followers fell, others abandoned their horses and mules and deserted, and others surrendered. Yeshaq himself escaped only with difficulty, throwing off his iron helmet as he fled. Many of the Portuguese fighting for him were taken prisoner. The few Portuguese on each side had little wish to die for causes that were not clear to them, and firearms played no important part in the battle. After his victory Minas camped where he could watch the roads to the sea, and turned south only once the monsoon had passed and no Portuguese fleet could arrive.

=== Defeat of Tazkaro ===
Minas marched back in haste, reaching Begemder in the middle of the rainy season, when armies normally rested. (Note: Abir reverses the order of the two battles, saying that the rebels in Dembiya were defeated first, and that Minas then chased Yeshaq from Tigray to the coast.) The rebels, who had assembled a large cavalry and many Portuguese soldiers, attacked the emperor in the evening rather than letting him camp nearby, and were routed. According to Diogo do Couto, the Portuguese on either side led the vanguards but refused to fight each other and instead attacked the Ethiopians. Tazkaro, Yoḥannes and Keflo fled together and hid in the bushes. Keflo, explaining that the others would remain unharmed but that he would be slaughtered if caught, parted from them and was never seen again, and Tazkaro and Yoḥannes were captured the next morning. The chronicle dates the victory to Thursday, 9 Ḥamle, which corresponds to 3 July 1561. (Note: Pereira interprets the date of the chronicle as the day of the capture, and so dates the battle to 2 July 1561, the same date that the Jesuits and Páez gave. Girma Beshah and Merid Wolde Aregay also give the date 2 July 1561, and state that Keflo was killed. The chronicle of Susenyos states that the death of Keflo was certain, although his body was not found, and nobody knew who had killed him. Couto writes that Keflo was captured and beheaded on the emperor's order, and places Yeshaq at this battle along with Keflo and Yoḥannes; Merid Wolde Aregay rejects this version as incorrect.)

According to the Jesuits, eight of Tazkaro's Portuguese were killed and twenty captured, and Minas later had fifteen of the prisoners put to death. Couto also writes that the emperor first offered to hand over the prisoners to Afonso de França, who commanded the loyal Portuguese troops, but França rejected the offer because he did not want to be suspected. The loyal Portuguese troops also refused to take in the wives and children of those who had fought for the rebels. Oviedo was kept as a prisoner at court, and Minas confiscated the property of the Portuguese and suspended their privileges; in Couto's version the emperor released the bishop and kept him with the army, well treated, in order to win over the Portuguese.

Tazkaro was later killed in captivity, according to both Páez and Susenyos's subsequent chronicle, after being cast off a cliff. Susenyos's chronicle, which tends to criticize Minas's conduct, says that Tazkaro was sent to Bora, where relatives of the emperor's wife threw him off a precipice, and that Minas did not punish them. (Note: The chronicle's statement about who was responsible for the death has been interpreted in two ways. According to Kropp, it was an execution ordered by Minas, whereas according to Merid Wolde Aregay, the relatives of the empress Sellus Hayla acted on her instruction, and he calls the version "apologetic". Bruce located the precipice at Lamalmo in Wegera.) His refusal to show compassion toward a conquered foe became one of the major charges against him. Páez, who claims that Minas was even less merciful than portrayed by his chronicler, writes that the peasants who buried the body were punished by the confiscation of their land, and that some of the Portuguese captured with Tazkaro were hacked to death with small axes or thrown alive off cliffs. Almeida repeats the story.

After the rains Minas marched against a second pretender, set up by the qwalla shum, the governor of the lowland districts south-east of Lake Tana. He captured the pretender, although, in the words of the Jesuits, "the whole land remained against him", and he returned from this campaign in January 1562.

== Ottoman alliance (1561–1563) ==
=== Pact with the pasha ===
It is very unlikely that Yeshaq had any contact with the pasha before July 1561. According to Couto, Minas offered Yeshaq a royal pardon, which he refused, and the Jesuits wrote that he and Jácome "never wished to make friends" with the emperor while they waited for help from India. Yeshaq withdrew toward the coast with Jácome and the men who had escaped, and waited for ships from Goa. The defeat itself ended any chance of help from India: when news arrived that the emperor had won and the Bahr Negash had been "badly routed", the viceroy withdrew his offer of ships and decided that at least a thousand picked soldiers would now be needed, which he could not spare. According to the Jesuit Manuel Fernandes, Yeshaq, afraid that the emperor would come down on him, decided to make an alliance with the pasha, although the two had done each other great harm. The Jesuits judged that the Turks, driven out a few years earlier, could not have entered the country again without this alliance, which they blamed on the failure of the Portuguese to come.

After the rainy season, in the chronicler's words, "the spirit of Satan entered Yeshaq's heart" and led him to make peace with "the murderer of his brother". The two bound themselves by treaty and oath to be one "in life and death". The pact was arranged through the sultan of Dahlak, a friend of Yeshaq, and on 20 January 1562 Yeshaq, accompanied by Jácome and Harbo, met the pasha by a stream a few leagues from Arqiqo. The pasha sent one of his sons to Yeshaq as a hostage for as long as the alliance lasted.

Accounts of what Yeshaq gave in return vary: one-third of the kingdom, according to a report that reached Cairo; the lands between Debarwa and the coast; or part of the northern plateau. Others say he gave the strategic districts overlooking Massawa, as well as the right to build a fort at Debarwa. The Ottomans arrived in Debarwa in January 1562 with about 300 Turks and some Arab troops, along with artillery, firearms and horses; Ottoman sources mention nothing about the reoccupation. By March 1563 Yeshaq had brought in up to 1,300 Turkish, Arab and Ethiopian fighting men.

Yeshaq proclaimed Tazkaro's younger brother Marqos, a boy of eight or nine whom he had in his care, emperor under the throne name Aʾlaf Sagad, and married Marqos's sister to his own son Takla Mikael. According to Couto, the boy was living with Yeshaq together with his mother, a half-brother and a sister, and at the proclamation the pasha presented him with rich gifts and fine horses. According to the Jesuits, the rebels feared that Minas would kill the captive Tazkaro, and chose a brother whose birth was more legitimate. He was joined by Harbo, Keflo's son-in-law, and by Ethio-Portuguese leaders including Jácome, forming a three-way alliance with the Ottomans. Osman Pasha made great use of Yeshaq in recovering the lands lost after his father's death, and from then on the Ottoman ventures onto the highlands were closely tied to Yeshaq's policies. Yeshaq later defended his choice in a letter to the viceroy of India: "if perhaps you hear from anyone that I brought Turks into this land, I would not lack reasons to give for myself ... and if I joined them, it was because I lacked Portuguese".

=== Battle of Enderta ===
Jesuit sources say that in January 1562 Minas set out again, but he did not advance into Tigray until the season for a Portuguese fleet had passed, since he knew he would be abandoned if the Portuguese came. He assembled almost all the forces of the empire, including Hamalmal, Taklo of Damot and Rom Sagad of Shewa. His nobles attempted to persuade him not to attack an enemy equipped with firearms and cannons, arguing that "our equipment is weak and we cannot withstand the fire", but he answered with such anger that they fell silent. Afonso de França, the commander of the Portuguese who remained faithful to the emperor, tried unsuccessfully to counsel Minas to win over the dissident Portuguese through concessions. Later, the chronicle of Sarsa Dengel cited the battle as an example of a king who was defeated because he failed to listen to his counselors and would not wait for the right moment; this passage was omitted in the revision made under Susenyos. Minas had Oviedo brought back from the mountain where he had been banished for several months, and kept the Jesuits strictly under watch in his encampment. Yeshaq and the pasha marched from Aksum and met the imperial army in Enderta. According to Couto, Yeshaq brought the boy emperor, his father and Harbo, with about 100 horsemen, 1,000 infantry and some fifty Portuguese, and the pasha brought a similar force equipped with field artillery, while Minas had 600 horsemen and 10,000 infantry, of whom 200 were musketeers.

The emperor encamped on a plain between two mountains. The pasha scouted the position himself, had his guns dragged up onto the hills and opened fire while most of the emperor's captains stood by and watched, and on 20 April 1562 the imperial army dispersed in panic at the noise of the cannon. The Jesuits wrote that Minas was routed "after hardly any fighting and without anyone dying", his men fleeing "just through fear of the artillery" and leaving their camp to the enemy. The chronicle concedes that "the victory of this day fell to Esdemur", but says that only three well-known nobles were killed. (Note: Martínez d'Alòs-Moner notes that there are disagreements in the sources regarding the outcome, and thinks that a draw was the most probable result, which in practice was unfavorable for Minas. Both the chronicle and the Jesuit letters of that time describe a defeat for the emperor. Orhonlu notes that according to Budge, the Ethiopian chronicles recorded a victory for Minas, but according to Kropp's translation of the chronicle, the victory belongs to the pasha. The abridged chronicle notes only that in the third year of his reign Minas fought "the Turk Zemur Pasha", and the editor of this chronicle, René Basset, citing James Bruce, thought that Minas had won and that the Jesuits had lied about his defeat.) The chronicler adds that "the day of Yeshaq's fall had not yet come". According to Couto, the Turks took many prisoners in the pursuit, and the pasha and Yeshaq occupied the emperor's camp, where they found much booty. The Jesuits in the imperial camp, who with about twelve Portuguese had been kept there like guarded prisoners, were captured in the rout; they wrote afterward that they had thought it a lesser misfortune to trust themselves to the Turks than to remain in the emperor's hands, and had not really tried to flee. According to Páez, Oviedo stayed kneeling in prayer in the middle of the field while the Turks passed by, then rode to Yeshaq's camp, "since he had been good friends with him for a long time", and Yeshaq had the captured fathers released at the request of the Portuguese. Almeida specifies that one of Yeshaq's Christian captains, a friend of the Jesuits, asked the pasha for them, and the Jesuits wrote that Yeshaq returned their chalice, while they had to buy back the rest of what they had lost. The Portuguese who had stayed with the emperor all went over to Yeshaq.

=== Death of Minas ===
Minas retreated through Wag to Atronsa Maryam, where he spent the rainy season of 1562 rebuilding his army, collecting smiths and keeping gunsmiths at work day and night. Yeshaq and the pasha did not pursue him. The rains were near, and the pasha used this pause to ask for men and money: around August 1562 about 400 Turks were sent to him from Egypt, and he asked the sultan for more. After the rains Minas marched north once more, sending Hamalmal, his brother Yoḥannes and Zarʾa Yoḥannes ahead to seize the cattle of the Dobeʿa as provisions, while a second column under Taklo went by way of Wag. Before reaching Tigray, Minas died of illness on 30 January 1563. Before his death he ordered the remaining Portuguese prisoners executed. (Note: Páez and Girma Beshah and Merid Wolde Aregay give the date 10 February 1563, and Merid Wolde Aregay in his thesis gives 18 February. The editors of Páez explain that he converted the Ethiopian date, 5 Yakkatit, into the Gregorian calendar rather than the Julian.)

== Rebellion against Sarsa Dengel (1563–1567) ==
=== Succession crisis ===
Minas's death left Yeshaq in control of the north. The court officials in the camp enthroned Minas's thirteen-year-old son Sarsa Dengel at once, without waiting for the great lords, and Sabla Wangel took the boy to her residence at Mangesta Samayat in Gojjam. Hamalmal, the most powerful of the absent lords, refused to accept this, and most of the royal army went over to him. Zarʾa Yoḥannes and the other loyal Tigrayan nobles stayed in the north, probably to defend their districts against Yeshaq. According to the monk Pawlos, Hamalmal and Yeshaq met and agreed to make Marqos emperor, after which Hamalmal went toward Shewa and Yeshaq toward Begemder. (Note: Merid Wolde Aregay puts this meeting at the beginning of 1563, when Hamalmal moved to the north after the death of Minas, and suggests that the two had agreed to meet at Mangesta Samayat, but Yeshaq stopped in Begemder. Conti Rossini identifies it with their later meeting on the Blue Nile, at which their alliance ended.) In March 1563 the Jesuits reported that Hamalmal, his brother Yoḥannes and other great lords had joined Marqos, and that Yeshaq and Hamalmal, with up to 700 Turks and many others, were searching for Minas's son, who was said to be fleeing from them. They expected that once the rebels had the boy they would hurry to drive out the Turks, who were few and were hated by Ethiopians of every rank. Fernandes added that Marqos had displayed signs of favor to the Portuguese, that his mother was eager to have him among them, and that Yeshaq had sworn before the bishop and Jácome that he would accept whatever soldiers the viceroy might send. Very soon afterward Harbo came to Sabla Wangel and demanded that she should give up Sarsa Dengel and his brother, saying that Yeshaq had sent for them. The purpose was to capture the young emperor and bring him under Yeshaq's power.

According to the chronicle, on the same day a man appeared at the compound's fence and, without uttering any words, gripped his own throat with one hand and pointed with the other toward the sea; the household understood that the boys were to be chained by the neck and brought to the coast, "for such is the custom of the Turks". Sabla Wangel convinced Harbo to let her keep the children under her care for the night, and the boys managed to escape that night, traveling for three days to cross the Abbay into Shewa. Harbo sent people to search for them on every road and promised a governorship to whoever brought them back. Yeshaq's intervention turned the balance against Hamalmal, since it drove Sarsa Dengel to find support among regional lords such as Taklo of Damot. (Note: The Jesuits, writing in July 1564, stated that Yeshaq, with the aid of the Ottomans, had actually captured the young emperor and left him a prisoner, and only later broke with the Turks. Merid Wolde Aregay rejects this story, suggesting that the Jesuits tried to defend their protector by blaming the party of Sarsa Dengel for the break.) Sarsa Dengel was crowned once again by a loyal regiment on 2 September 1563.

=== Break with Hamalmal ===
Hamalmal raised his own pretender, Takla Maryam, an elderly kinsman, and from December 1563 faced the emperor and Taklo in a long standoff in Damot. Taklo strengthened the emperor's side by winning over Asmaddin, the leader of the Muslims who had settled in Waj, with his 800 horsemen. The chronicle of Sarsa Dengel says that the alliance between Hamalmal and Yeshaq broke down because Hamalmal sent Yeshaq only the royal tent, keeping the insignia, horses and officials he had seized. Yeshaq, who had moved toward the Abbay to receive them, turned back in anger and sent the boy he had made king, with his mother, to Hamalmal to test whether he would hand over what was due, and Marqos arrived at the same time as Takla Maryam, so that there were two pretenders to the throne in one camp. Merid Wolde Aregay describes a meeting between the two on the bank of the Nile, at which Yeshaq failed to win Hamalmal over to Marqos and returned to Debarwa, leaving the boy behind. He notes that the rebel of Tigray "was no longer the formidable enemy or rival that he had been before". The explanations of the break vary: that Hamalmal realized he would be overshadowed by Yeshaq and Harbo if their protégé succeeded, that he put forward Takla Maryam to shut out Yeshaq's influence, or that the Amhara and Shewan noblemen feared that Yeshaq would restore Tigrayan predominance at court. Yeshaq possibly decided not to fight because he needed all his forces in the north to resist the Ottomans.

In February 1564 Hamalmal, besieged and short of food, surrendered. He deposed his own pretender and handed over both Takla Maryam and "another boy that Azmâch Isaac had sent him" as captives to the emperor, who did them no harm. With Marqos in Sarsa Dengel's hands, Yeshaq no longer had a candidate for the throne. The Jesuits believed in July 1564 that the boy was alive and in the keeping of Sabla Wangel or of one of his aunts. Two days after the surrender, Hamalmal's regiments, including the men of Fasilo, mutinied and plundered the imperial camp, and it was Hamalmal who persuaded them to submit. Hamalmal received Gojjam and died late in 1564.

=== Break with the Ottomans ===
Victory had made the Turks arrogant, and they do not appear to have received what they expected as their reward for it. As long as "Zemur" lived, the personal relations between him and Yeshaq preserved the alliance. After his death Yeshaq fell on his former allies, captured their commander and drove them down to the coast, where they were joined by a son of the late pasha who had arrived with a few men. The Turks then returned, guided according to the Jesuits by partisans of the late emperor, defeated Yeshaq's men not far from Debarwa and reoccupied the town. Fernandes, who was at Debarwa in the spring of 1563, says that two commanders fought a pitched battle "almost within sight" of the town, and that "the one who ruled those parts" was put to flight. According to the monk Pawlos, after the death of "Zemur" the Turks raided the land and captured Yeshaq, put him in chains before releasing him, and for a time it was not known whether he was alive or dead. Writing in July 1564, the Jesuits reported that the Turks at Debarwa were few, but that they had carried off a great number of captives in their first raid. In 1564 Yeshaq pushed the Ottomans off the highlands to Arqiqo and Massawa, losing two of his sons in the fighting. (Note: Abir writes that Yeshaq chased the pasha to the coast as soon as he learned of the death of Minas in 1563.)

The cause of the quarrel is not known. The pasha may have regarded the whole northern province as Ottoman territory and Yeshaq as his subject, or Yeshaq may have offended his allies by giving up the claim of Marqos. He may also have come to see an alliance with Muslim foreigners as an obstacle to the position he wanted, that of protector of the emperor and the kingdom. Osman Pasha had begun to grow suspicious of Yeshaq's dealings with the Portuguese and tightened his control of communications between India and Ethiopia. Ottoman reinforcements reached Habesh at the end of 1563 but, after limited successes against the Bahr Negash, were ordered to Yemen to suppress the Zaydi revolt there. In 1564 Arab tribes subject to the Funj attacked and for a time besieged Suakin, and because the governor was at Massawa a separate district governor had to be appointed there. For several years the garrison of Massawa numbered only a handful of men. Osman Pasha spent most of his seven years as governor fighting campaigns in the Danakil lowlands, and in August 1567 he was removed from the province. In May 1567 Oviedo could report that the Turks had "left the land", and that the sea was clearer than it had been at any time since his arrival, although they still retained Arqiqo and Massawa. Later, an Ottoman chronicle spoke about "the rebel İshak", vizier to the king of Ethiopia, as someone who initially submitted to Özdemir Pasha but later betrayed him.

=== Yeshaq and the Jesuits ===
After Enderta the Jesuits stayed under Yeshaq's protection. He took them to Debarwa, where in June 1562, on news from Cairo that a new viceroy was on his way to India, the bishop, Jácome and the Portuguese gathered with their families to watch the sea for a fleet. In the same year Oviedo sent the Jesuit Gonçalo Gualdames to plead in person at Goa, but he was caught and killed by the Turks near Arqiqo. When the sailing season of 1563 passed without ships, Oviedo, Jácome and part of the Portuguese community left Debarwa, where they could not afford to live, for the neighborhood of the monastery of Abba Garima, three days' journey away. Yeshaq gave them land near Aksum, at a village they renamed Fremona. (Note: Martínez d'Alòs-Moner dates the move of the Jesuits to Fremona to the end of 1562 or the beginning of 1563, and elsewhere to the early or mid-1560s, whereas Pennec writes that the Jesuits wandered between Debarwa and the coast until Yeshaq granted them lands in Tigray in 1566. According to Oviedo, writing in June 1567, the two villages were founded "in the last two years", and Martínez d'Alòs-Moner's biography of Oviedo dates the settlement at Fremona to around 1565, after his stay in Debarwa.) Almost all the Portuguese stayed with Yeshaq in these years, and the Jesuits kept away from Sarsa Dengel's court because they lived in the land that Yeshaq ruled. The settlement stood on land that he had allotted as gwelt. In 1567 Oviedo wrote that the Catholics, who for years had been wandering "like gypsies", had established two small villages in Tigray on land obtained thanks to Yeshaq, and that about 230 of them lived there. About seventy more Portuguese lived in Dembiya. Fernandes reckoned that the Catholics, who had numbered more than a thousand when Gelawdewos died, were now fewer than five hundred, scattered across the kingdom. The community lived in poverty and constant danger from the Ottoman raids out of Debarwa, and a Jesuit who reached Oviedo in 1566 found him "in such a poor and abject state that it hurts to see him". The Jesuits did not experience any difficulty from the Turks as neighbors during the alliance, although the pasha was aware that Yeshaq's partnership with the Portuguese could lead to the expulsion of the Turks from Massawa, and Yeshaq, unwilling to lose Ottoman support, openly withdrew his protection from the mission while secretly urging the bishop to seek aid.

Oviedo repeatedly urged the Portuguese to intervene on behalf of Yeshaq and Marqos. The Jesuits told the viceroy that 300 men, or 600 at most, would be enough to settle the kingdom, warning him that if the Turks, attracted by its gold, ever became masters of Ethiopia, they would pose a threat to Malindi, Mozambique and Sofala. After the deaths of King João III in 1557 and of Barreto in 1562, however, his petitions were ignored in Lisbon and Goa, and in 1566 the Pope and the Portuguese regent ordered him to leave Ethiopia and proceed to China or Japan. In June 1567 Oviedo replied that he could not abandon the Catholics and that 500 or 600 soldiers would suffice to make Ethiopia submit to Rome. Among the lords who would welcome them he named Yeshaq, who was "like the king" in Tigray, and the emperor's cousin Yoḥannes. A month earlier he had told the viceroy that the emperor was far away and "does not rule in these parts of Tigray now, only the Bahr Negash". Francis Borgia, the general of the Jesuits, supported Oviedo's case with the Pope, without result.

Letters from Goa had hinted that Portugal might act if responsible Ethiopians asked for help, and the messenger who arrived in 1566 reported that none had been sent because no one in Ethiopia had requested it. To show that the Ethiopian nobility were waiting for Portuguese soldiers, Oviedo had Yeshaq and Yoḥannes write to Goa. In a letter of 2 June 1567 Yeshaq told the viceroy that Ethiopia was "now more about to be lost than ever", and that he was waiting on the coast to receive the Portuguese, as was Harbo, of whom he had just taken leave in Dembiya. Oviedo explained that the original was being withheld for fear it would fall into the hands of the Turks, "with whom he feigns friendship" in order to use them against his enemies, and asked the viceroy to write to Yeshaq, Yoḥannes and Harbo, the last of whom he described as now one of the chief men of the kingdom. In a second letter, of 30 June, Yeshaq excused his long silence by his distance from the coast and his fighting against the Turks, called his friendship with the Portuguese that "of brothers and sons", and asked that the soldiers bring bombards, which his own men would carry inland. Yoḥannes, the rebel of 1561, who by now occupied the position of Tigre Mekonnen, complained in his own letter that his two previous appeals had gone unanswered, and said that there were those in Ethiopia who wanted the Turks and others the Muslims, "and between these extremes Ethiopia is placed". The Portuguese of Tigray reported that the late emperor had been "much disliked by all the great men, chiefly by Azmach Yeshaq, who is the greatest person in the kingdom", while Jácome requested that, if no soldiers were to be sent, at least some ships should come to remove the Portuguese with their wives and children.

=== Reconciliation ===
From the second half of 1564 church leaders, lesser nobles and army commanders began to return to Sarsa Dengel's camp. In September 1566 the regimental commander Fasilo, whom the emperor had made governor of Damot the year before, attacked the court and almost killed the emperor. He then set up a rival emperor, but his regiments deserted him, and in January 1567 he was defeated. Fasilo ran away with around fifty horsemen toward Yeshaq, who is described by the chronicler as the originator of the revolt, but Fasilo was captured en route and brought to Harbo, who placed him in prison on the island of Daq in Lake Tana.

According to the chronicle of Sarsa Dengel, Yeshaq then became reconciled and came "to meet the two sovereigns near the Abbay", in the rainy season of 1567, while the emperor was at Quarab. Yeshaq's envoy Agar, who came with a priest and one of Yeshaq's followers, swore to the agreement under oath and threat of excommunication in the presence of the emperor and his aunt Amatta Giyorgis. The agreement was made possible through Harbo. The chronicler relates the joy felt at Quarab that season, and adds that the peace lasted "until the day when the azmach Yeshaq broke it". (Note: Quotations from the chronicle of Sarsa Dengel in this article are translated from Conti Rossini's French translation, which dates this rainy season to 1567. According to the monk Pawlos, this reconciliation was between Yeshaq and the queen mother.) Sarsa Dengel reinstated Yeshaq as Bahr Negash.

Yeshaq and Harbo accepted Sarsa Dengel only once they were assured of recognition of their governorships and semi-autonomous status. Weakened by his wars and without the foreign help he had hoped for, Yeshaq could no longer hold out alone, and the papal and royal letters of 1566 had ended his hope of ever getting soldiers from India. According to Merid Wolde Aregay, Yeshaq placed 700 of his soldiers in the emperor's service. (Note: The chronicle mentions these men in its account of the campaign of Sarsa Dengel against the Bosa in the fifth year of his reign. It says that the father of the Bosa chieftain had killed many soldiers of Gelawdewos's army, and that after his own victory the emperor pitched his tent "where Tabase and the other brave men had fallen", together with "the soldiers of the Bahr Negash Yeshaq, partly mounted and partly armed with shields, about 700 in number", while the clergy sang hymns about "the fall of the brave in that place" and the emperor's revenge for his father. According to Conti Rossini, the reference concerns a defeat suffered about 1554, when many soldiers of Yeshaq were among some 700 men killed on a mountain in the Bosha country during one of Gelawdewos's southern campaigns.) During the rainy season of 1568 he sent a considerable tribute of fine cloth, carpets and horses, "for his heart was then upright", in the chronicler's words. He sent more gifts in 1571.

== Aftermath ==
In 1567, the very year of the reconciliation, Yeshaq and Harbo were urgently asking the Portuguese in India for military help, and both men regarded themselves as more than ordinary officers whom the emperor could remove at will. While the emperor campaigned in the south they enlarged their armies, traded with the Turks and obtained firearms from them, and were in practice autonomous; a Jesuit wrote in 1575 that Harbo had ruled Dembiya for many years more against the emperor's will than by it. They in turn had reason to fear that the emperor did not trust them and would remove them once he felt secure.

When Sarsa Dengel came to Dembiya in 1571–1572, both Harbo and Yeshaq declared their loyalty to him. The chronicle has the emperor say that if the two felt ashamed to approach his camp, considering how they had treated him and his father, he would go to them himself "and remain in agreement with them in humility and friendship". The abridged chronicle identifies the meeting as taking place during the ninth year of the reign, when the emperor received many presents from the two men. In addition, Harbo entertained the imperial court with lavish banquets at Gubaʿe and presented more than 100 horses in one day. The emperor waited for Yeshaq and met him near the Angareb river on the fourth Saturday of Lent in 1572. Yeshaq gave rich gifts of horses, garments and carpets, although the chronicler remarks that he was not thanked as Harbo was, because his gifts, though greater that day, "did not last". Sarsa Dengel also married Maryam Sena, who according to an unpublished account by Páez was Yeshaq's sister. According to Merid Wolde Aregay, the meetings proved unsuccessful, for the two lords took the emperor's humility for weakness, and no arrangement concerning their arrears of revenue is mentioned.

Yeshaq left in haste on news of an Ottoman attack. In his absence the Ottomans, reinforced at Massawa, had retaken Debarwa and raided as far as the country south of the Mareb, plundering the Portuguese settlements, and many of the Portuguese moved to Dembiya. Pawlos notes that some of the local governors sided with the Turks. Yeshaq seems to have driven them out of Debarwa, but a new attack in 1574 left a Turkish garrison in the town. Around the same time a large group of Ethio-Portuguese was allowed to settle in Dembiya, and Jácome reconciled the Catholics with the emperor, so that by 1575 they had recovered most of their privileges and their places in his army.

After Harbo's death Yeshaq became the last great lord who still defied the emperor. (Note: According to Abir, Harbo died in 1574. The monk Pawlos dates this event to Tuesday, 17 Miyazya, in the Year of Mercy 227, that is, in April 1575, and the abridged chronicle places it in the twelfth year of the reign.) Harbo's regiment threatened to go over to Yeshaq, who sent word to the emperor not to summon him, "for I am seized by fear", and not to come to him. Yeshaq suspected that the emperor, who was related through his mother to the rival house of Bora and Salawa, ignored his requests for reinforcements against the Turks in order to wear down his power and replace him with one of his own kinsmen. He had a competitor for the office of governor of Tigray in Daragot, a kinsman of the queen mother from Bora who had married into the royal family, and whom the emperor appointed as governor of Tigray when he marched against Yeshaq. In the mid-1570s Yeshaq refused to obey the emperor's commands, set up a new pretender and made common cause once more with the Ottomans; Sarsa Dengel defeated him at Enticho on 13 November 1578 and at Addi Qarro on 26 December 1578, where both Yeshaq and the Ottoman pasha were killed. (Note: According to Merid Wolde Aregay and Giancarlo Casale, the battle of Addi Qarro took place in 1579, whereas according to Pankhurst it was in 1576, and according to Girma Beshah and Merid Wolde Aregay in December 1580. The annals of Addi Neammin record the death of Yeshaq, "and the Turks with their king", in the year 231 of the Era of Mercy (1578–1579), adding that Debarwa was burned then.) Sarsa Dengel then lowered the status of the Bahr Negash, which never fully recovered. Oviedo died at Fremona in 1577. Páez relates that Yeshaq, whom he calls the viceroy of Tigray, used to visit the patriarch whenever he passed Fremona, said that the land was sustained by his prayers, and lamented at the news of his death that "we are all finished". Fremona remained the main center of the Catholic mission until the Jesuits were expelled in 1633.

== Legacy ==
Merid Wolde Aregay attributes the start of the civil war to Minas's "unwise and ill-timed handling of some of the nobility", but sees it more broadly as part of the old struggle between the monarchy's drive toward absolute rule and the nobility's defense of its autonomy, which had been set aside under Gelawdewos. He argues that without Ottoman support for Yeshaq the war would probably have been brief and the emperor would have emerged with greater control over the nobles, but that its prolongation left the professional regiments loyal only to their own interests at a time of growing Oromo and Muslim invasions. He also believes that Oviedo's interference brought the struggle between Minas and Yeshaq "beyond compromise and reconciliation". Richard Pankhurst endorses Merid Wolde Aregay's view that Yeshaq's rebellion came not from "separatist motives" but from a "strong desire to influence national policies". Abir instead places Yeshaq's revolts within a longer history of Tigrayan resentment at the loss of the region's primacy within the Solomonic kingdom. Conti Rossini had likewise seen the hasty enthronement of Sarsa Dengel as a move by the court to prevent the hegemony of the northern provinces, in the old rivalry between Tigray and the Amhara and Shewan lands. The Turkish historian Cengiz Orhonlu, noting his changes of side, called Yeshaq "the Alcibiades of Ethiopia". Conti Rossini called him "the perfect type of the Abyssinian feudal lord": ambitious, restless, intelligent and belligerent, and without scruples whenever his craving for power or his wish for autonomy came into play.

Merid Wolde Aregay writes that the Jesuits' support for the rebels left the emperor and his court deeply suspicious of Portugal and Catholicism, so that the Portuguese, once seen as saviors of the country, came to be regarded as a danger to its independence. Denis Nosnitsin similarly notes that Oviedo's support for Yeshaq and his candidate, and Yeshaq's alliance with the Ottomans, compromised the Jesuits in Sarsa Dengel's eyes.

== Bibliography ==
=== Primary sources ===
- Almeida, Manuel de (1907). Beccari, Camillo (ed.). Rerum Aethiopicarum Scriptores Occidentales Inediti a Saeculo XVI ad XIX (in Portuguese). Vol. 5: P. Emmanuelis d'Almeida S.I. Historia Aethiopiae, liber I–IV. Rome: C. de Luigi.
- Basset, René, ed. (1882). Études sur l'histoire d'Éthiopie (in French). Paris: Imprimerie nationale.
- Beccari, Camillo, ed. (1910). Rerum Aethiopicarum Scriptores Occidentales Inediti a Saeculo XVI ad XIX. Vol. 10: Relationes et epistolae variorum, pars prima, liber I. Rome: C. de Luigi.
- Conti Rossini, Carlo, ed. (1907a). Historia regis Sarṣa Dengel (Malak Sagad): Textus. Corpus Scriptorum Christianorum Orientalium 20; Scriptores Aethiopici, series altera 3 (in Geez). Paris; Leipzig: E Typographeo Reipublicae; Otto Harrassowitz.
- Conti Rossini, Carlo, ed. (1907b). Historia regis Sarṣa Dengel (Malak Sagad). Accedit Historia gentis Galla, interprete I. Guidi. Corpus Scriptorum Christianorum Orientalium 21; Scriptores Aethiopici, versio, series altera 3 (in French). Paris; Leipzig: E Typographeo Reipublicae, Carolus Poussielgue; Otto Harrassowitz.
- Couto, Diogo do (1782). Da Asia: Década VII, parte I (in Portuguese). Lisbon: Regia Officina Typografica.
- Kolmodin, Johannes, ed. (1914). Traditions de Tsazzega et Hazzega: Annales et documents. Archives d'études orientales 5:3 (in French). Uppsala: Edv. Berling.
- Kropp, Manfred (1988). Die Geschichte des Lebna-Dengel, Claudius und Minas. Corpus Scriptorum Christianorum Orientalium 504; Scriptores Aethiopici 84 (in German). Leuven: Peeters.
- Páez, Pedro (2011). Boavida, Isabel; Pennec, Hervé; Ramos, Manuel João (eds.). Pedro Páez's History of Ethiopia, 1622. Hakluyt Society, Third Series 24. Vol. 2. Translated by Christopher J. Tribe. Farnham: Ashgate.
- Pereira, Francisco Maria Esteves (1888). "Historia de Minás, ʿAdamâs Sagad, rei de Ethiopia". Boletim da Sociedade de Geographia de Lisboa (in Portuguese).
- Pereira, Francisco Maria Esteves, ed. (1900). Chronica de Susenyos, rei de Ethiopia (in Portuguese). Vol. 2: Traducção e notas. Lisbon: Imprensa Nacional.

=== Secondary sources ===
- Abir, Mordechai (1980). Ethiopia and the Red Sea: The Rise and Decline of the Solomonic Dynasty and Muslim–European Rivalry in the Region. London: Frank Cass.
- Casale, Giancarlo (2010). The Ottoman Age of Exploration. New York: Oxford University Press. ISBN 978-0-19-537782-8.
- Chernetsov, Sevir (2003). "Baḥər nägaš before the 18th century". In Uhlig, Siegbert (ed.). Encyclopaedia Aethiopica. Vol. 1. Wiesbaden: Harrassowitz. p. 444.
- Conti Rossini, Carlo (1918). "L'autobiografia di Pawlos, monaco abissino del secolo XVI". Rendiconti della Reale Accademia dei Lincei, Classe di scienze morali, storiche e filologiche. 5 (in Italian). 27: 279–296.
- Conti Rossini, Carlo (1921). "La guerra turco-abissina del 1578". Oriente Moderno (in Italian). 1 (10–11): 634–636, 684–691.
- Conti Rossini, Carlo (1922). "La guerra turco-abissina del 1578 (continuazione e fine)". Oriente Moderno (in Italian). 2 (1): 48–57.
- Girma Beshah; Merid Wolde Aregay (1964). The Question of the Union of the Churches in Luso-Ethiopian Relations (1500–1632). Lisbon: Junta de Investigações do Ultramar and Centro de Estudos Históricos Ultramarinos.
- Kleiner, Michael (2005). "Ḥamälmal". In Uhlig, Siegbert (ed.). Encyclopaedia Aethiopica. Vol. 2. Wiesbaden: Harrassowitz. pp. 982–983.
- Kleiner, Michael (2007). "Minas". In Uhlig, Siegbert (ed.). Encyclopaedia Aethiopica. Vol. 3. Wiesbaden: Harrassowitz. pp. 969–971.
- Kropp, Manfred (2001). "Un cas de censure politique au XVII^{e} siècle : la chronique de Śarṣa-Dəngəl". Annales d'Éthiopie (in French). 17: 257–277. doi:10.3406/ethio.2001.1003.
- Kropp, Manfred (2025). "Die Kompilation in der äthiopischen Historiographie – bevorzugte Gattung oder Zufall der handschriftlichen Überlieferung". In Solomon Gebreyes Beyene (ed.). Ethiopic Historiographical Texts: Textual Transmission, Edition, Translation, and Interpretation. Supplement to Aethiopica 13 (in German). Wiesbaden: Harrassowitz. pp. 13–48. doi:10.13173/9783447124645. ISBN 978-3-447-12464-5.
- Martínez d'Alòs-Moner, Andreu (2003). "The Jesuit Patriarchate to the Preste: Between Religious Reform, Political Expansion and Colonial Adventure". Aethiopica. 6: 54–69.
- Martínez d'Alòs-Moner, Andreu (2005). "Fəremona". In Uhlig, Siegbert (ed.). Encyclopaedia Aethiopica. Vol. 2. Wiesbaden: Harrassowitz. pp. 527–528.
- Martínez d'Alòs-Moner, Andreu (2010). "Oviedo, Andrés de". In Uhlig, Siegbert (ed.). Encyclopaedia Aethiopica. Vol. 4. Wiesbaden: Harrassowitz. p. 83.
- Martínez d'Alòs-Moner, Andreu (2012). "Conquistadores, Mercenaries, and Missionaries: The Failed Portuguese Dominion of the Red Sea". Northeast African Studies. 12 (1): 1–28. JSTOR 41960556.
- Martínez d'Alòs-Moner, Andreu (2015). Envoys of a Human God: The Jesuit Mission to Christian Ethiopia, 1557–1632. Leiden: Brill. ISBN 978-90-04-28914-7.
- Merid Wolde Aregay (1971). Southern Ethiopia and the Christian Kingdom 1508–1708, with Special Reference to the Galla Migrations and Their Consequences (PhD thesis). School of Oriental and African Studies, University of London.
- Merid Wolde Aregay (1980). "A Reappraisal of the Impact of Firearms in the History of Warfare in Ethiopia (c. 1500–1800)". Journal of Ethiopian Studies. 14: 98–121. JSTOR 41965889.
- Merid Wolde Aregay (1998). "The Legacy of Jesuit Missionary Activities in Ethiopia from 1555 to 1632". In Getatchew Haile; Lande, Aasulv; Rubenson, Samuel (eds.). The Missionary Factor in Ethiopia: Papers from a Symposium on the Impact of European Missions on Ethiopian Society, Lund University, August 1996. Studies in the Intercultural History of Christianity 110. Frankfurt am Main: Peter Lang. pp. 31–56.
- Nosnitsin, Denis (2010). "Śärṣä Dəngəl". In Uhlig, Siegbert; Bausi, Alessandro (eds.). Encyclopaedia Aethiopica. Vol. 4. Wiesbaden: Harrassowitz. pp. 544–547.
- Nosnitsin, Denis (2014). "Yəsḥaq". In Bausi, Alessandro (ed.). Encyclopaedia Aethiopica. Vol. 5. Wiesbaden: Harrassowitz. pp. 60–61.
- Orhonlu, Cengiz (1996) [1974]. Osmanlı İmparatorluğu'nun Güney Siyaseti: Habeş Eyaleti (in Turkish) (2nd ed.). Ankara: Türk Tarih Kurumu. ISBN 975-16-0798-1.
- Özbaran, Salih (1994). The Ottoman Response to European Expansion: Studies on Ottoman–Portuguese Relations in the Indian Ocean and Ottoman Administration in the Arab Lands during the Sixteenth Century. Analecta Isisiana 12. Istanbul: Isis Press. ISBN 978-975-428-066-1.
- Pankhurst, Richard (2005). "Dǝbarwa". In Uhlig, Siegbert (ed.). Encyclopaedia Aethiopica. Vol. 2. Wiesbaden: Harrassowitz. pp. 122–123.
- Pankhurst, Richard (1997). The Ethiopian Borderlands: Essays in Regional History from Ancient Times to the End of the 18th Century. Lawrenceville, NJ: Red Sea Press. ISBN 978-0-932415-19-6.
- Pennec, Hervé (2003). Des jésuites au royaume du prêtre Jean (Éthiopie): stratégies, rencontres et tentatives d'implantation, 1495–1633 (in French). Paris: Centre culturel Calouste Gulbenkian. ISBN 972-8462-32-8.
- Şahin Allahverdi, Reyhan (2013). "Kızıldeniz'de Osmanlı Hâkimiyeti: Özdemiroğlu Osman Paşa'nın Habeşistan Beylerbeyliği (1561–1567)". The Studies of the Ottoman Domain (in Turkish). 3 (5): 35–48.
- Solomon Gebreyes Beyene (2025). "Edition of the Chronicle of King Śarḍa Dǝngǝl (r. 1563–1597): Textual Tradition and Stemma Codicum". In Solomon Gebreyes Beyene (ed.). Ethiopic Historiographical Texts: Textual Transmission, Edition, Translation, and Interpretation. Supplement to Aethiopica 13. Wiesbaden: Harrassowitz. pp. 89–117. doi:10.13173/9783447124645. ISBN 978-3-447-12464-5.
- Taddesse Tamrat (1977). "Ethiopia, the Red Sea and the Horn". In Oliver, Roland (ed.). The Cambridge History of Africa. Vol. 3. Cambridge: Cambridge University Press. pp. 98–182.
- Tsegay Berhe G. Libanos (2003). "Adyabo". In Uhlig, Siegbert (ed.). Encyclopaedia Aethiopica. Vol. 1. Wiesbaden: Harrassowitz. p. 110.
- van Donzel, Emeri (2010). "Özdemir". In Uhlig, Siegbert (ed.). Encyclopaedia Aethiopica. Vol. 4. Wiesbaden: Harrassowitz. p. 86.
