= Menas of Ethiopia =

Emperor of Ethiopia from 1559 to 1563

Menas ዐፄ ሜናስ
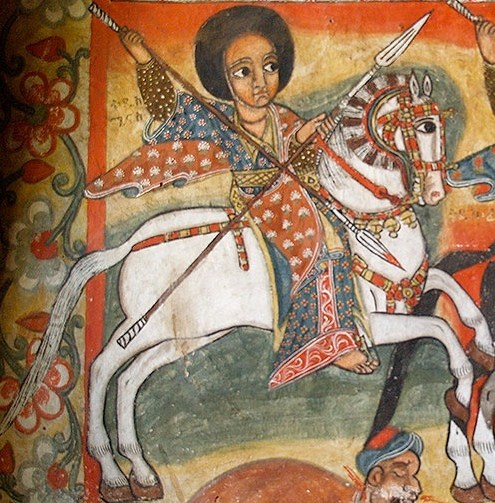
- Mural depicting Emperor Menas at Ura Kidane Mehret Church, Ethiopia

Emperor of Ethiopia
- Reign: 1559–1563
- Predecessor: Gelawdewos
- Successor: Sarsa Dengel
- Born: 1535
- Died: 1563 (aged 27–28); Wag, Ethiopian Empire
- Spouse: Adimas Moas
- Issue: Sarsa Dengel; Lesana Kristos; Hawaryat; Tazkaro
Regnal name
- Admas Sagad I
- House: House of Solomon
- Father: Lebna Dengel
- Religion: Ethiopian Orthodox Tewahedo (1535-1542, 1543-1563); Islam (1542-1543)

Menas (Ge'ez: ሜናስ, romanized: mēnās) or Minas, throne name Admas Sagad I (Ge’ez: አድማስ ሰገድ, died 1563), was Emperor of Ethiopia from 1559 until his death in 1563, and a member of the Solomonic dynasty. He was a brother of Gelawdewos and the son of Emperor Dawit II.

== Early life ==
According to a genealogy collected by James Bruce, Menas' father Lebna Dengel arranged Menas to be married to the daughter of Robel, governor of Bora and Selawe; upon becoming empress she took the name Adimas Moas. They had two children, Fiqtor and Theodora.

During Ahmad ibn Ibrahim al-Ghazi's invasion of Ethiopia, Menas had been captured but treated well as a valuable prisoner. The typical fate of prisoners of war at the time was to be castrated and enslaved. This clemency came to an end in 1542, when the Imam, desperate for help from his fellow Muslims, included Menas in an assortment of extravagant gifts to the sultan of Yemen in return for military aid. Portuguese Jesuit, Jeronimo Lobo stated that he was held a long-time prisoner in Yemen where he had converted to Islam.

However, Imam Ahmad's son was later captured in the aftermath of the Battle of Wayna Daga, Gelawdewos used his prisoner to recover his brother Menas; according to Pankhurst, "when the royal family was reunited there were many days of celebrations."

== Reign ==
Menas was crowned emperor at Mengista Samayat, now called Mengisto, southwest of Debre Werq in Gojjam, and shortly afterwards he campaigned against the Beta Israel in Semien province. According to Jeronimo Lobo, Menas was known to have all the bad qualities of his brother but not any of the good.

Menas made no use of his ancestors capitals in Shewa and Fatagar or of his predecessor's (Galawdewos) in Wej, and instead he established his residence in Guba'e (now known as Emfraz) a settlement located near Lake Tana.

He banished the Jesuit bishop Andrés de Oviedo and his companions to a village between Axum and Adwa called Maigwagwa (Tigrinya may g^{w}ag^{w}a, 'noisy water'), which the Jesuits had optimistically renamed Fremona, after the missionary Frumentius.

About one year into his reign, Bahr Negus Yeshaq rose in revolt in Medri Bahri against Menas, proclaiming Tazkaro, the illegitimate son of Emperor Menas' brother, Yaqob, as negus. Tazkaro was supported by the leader of the Portuguese who had followed Cristóvão da Gama into Ethiopia, and allegedly by "the Prime Men of the Kingdom." This revolt occupied Menas' attention for the remainder of his short reign. He marched into Lasta, at which point Yeshaq retreated into Shire. The emperor found him there and defeated Yeshaq, then turned south to Emfraz where he defeated the remaining supporters of Tazkaro on 2 July 1561. Tazkaro was captured, and Menas afterwards ordered him thrown from the rock of Lamalmon to his death.

Bahr Negash Yeshaq then obtained the support of Özdemir, the Ottoman Pasha of Massawa, and proclaimed Tazkaro's infant brother, Marqos, nəgusä nägäst. On 20 April 1562, Yeshaq and his ally Osman, the son of Özdemir, defeated Menas in a battle at Enderta. Lobo states that the Turks and the Bahr Negash joined forces against Menas, defeated him, and ruined his army so thoroughly that he could no longer hold the campaign; he was forced to hide in the mountains, where he led a wandering and languishing life until his death.

According to the Royal Chronicle of his reign, which Bruce follows in his account, the Emperor fell back to Atronsa Maryam to regroup for another assault on the Bahr Negash, but came down with a fever during the march, and died at Kolo on 1 February 1563. Budge, however, states Minas returned to Shewa, and then to the lowlands of Wag, where he was seized by the fever and died after a short illness.

== Notes ==
Regnal titles
Preceded by Gelawdewos	Emperor of Ethiopia; 1559–1563	Succeeded by Sarsa Dengel
