= Gelawdewos =

Emperor of Ethiopia from 1540 to 1559

Galawdewos ዐፄ ገላውዴዎስ
- Negusa Nagast
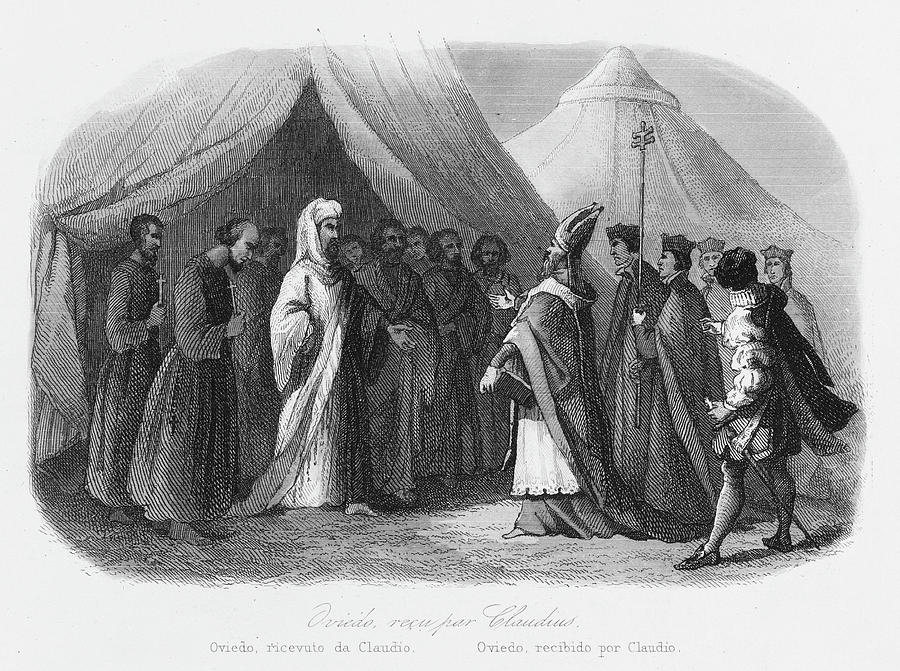
- Contemporary Portuguese depiction of Gelawdewos receiving the Latin Patriarch Andrés de Oviedo

Emperor of Ethiopia
- Reign: 3 September 1540 – 23 March 1559
- Predecessor: Dawit II
- Successor: Menas
- Born: 1521/1522; Amhara, Ethiopian Empire
- Died: 29 March 1559 (aged 37–38); Fatagar, Ethiopian Empire
- Issue: Sabana Giyorgis; Mashihawit
Names
- Mar Gelawdewos
Regnal name
- Atsnaf Sagad I
- Dynasty: House of Solomon
- Father: Dawit II
- Mother: Seble Wongel
- Religion: Ethiopian Orthodox

Galawdewos (Ge'ez: ገላውዴዎስ, 1521/1522 – 23 March 1559), also known as Claudius in European sources, was Emperor of Ethiopia from 3 September 1540 until his death in 1559, and a member of the Solomonic dynasty. His throne name was Atsnaph Sagad I (Ge'ez: አጽናፍ ሰገድ). A male line descendant of medieval Amhara kings, he was a younger son of Dawit II and Seble Wongel.

== Early reign ==
The son of Dawit II by his wife, Seble Wongel, after the death of his father Gelawdewos succeeded to the throne on 2 September 1540 at the age of 18. During imam Ahmed's occupation of Abyssinia, Galawdewos initially took refuge in the province of Gafat. Despite his youth, over the next few months he made several successful attacks on the Adalite garrisons in northern Ethiopia. At the time of the Portuguese arrival in Ethiopia, Gelawdewos was in northern Shewa leading a small guerrilla movement against the Muslim occupation. When he heard of the Portuguese arrival he marched northward to join them but the Portuguese had already started fighting Ahmad ibn Ibrahim in the province of Tigray.

The young emperor was able to make his way back up north where he met with the Portuguese survivors of Wofla and his mother Queen Seble Wongel at the "Mountain of the Jews", which Whiteway identifies as Amba Sel. They soon discovered that Ahmad ibn Ibrahim al-Ghazi was camped near the shores of Lake Tana and met him at the Battle of Wayna Daga on 21 February 1543, defeating and killing the Imam. With Ahmad's death, Gelawdewos was easily able to eject the leaderless Muslim forces from the highlands without encountering any significant resistance.

He then turned his attention to the numerous Ethiopians who had crossed over to the Imam's side, either to further themselves or out of self-preservation. While some presented themselves to Gelawdewos expecting to be pardoned, only to be executed, to many others he granted his safe conduct, according to Miguel de Castanhoso, "for there were so many [who had joined Imam Ahmad] that had he ordered all to be killed, he would have remained alone."

Following his victory at Wayna Daga, Gelawdewos had to deal with João Bermudes, a Portuguese priest whom his father had sent as his ambassador to secure help from Portugal. Bermudes had represented himself in Europe as the Patriarch of Ethiopia, and once he returned to Ethiopia, he claimed he had been appointed by Pope Paul III as Patriarch. According to Bermudes' own account of his time in Ethiopia, early in the reign of Gelawdewos he was banished to Gafat, south of the Blue Nile.

In response to his arguments, Gelawdewos wrote his Confession of Faith, which defended the Miaphysitism of the Ethiopian Orthodox Tewahedo Church. According to Richard Pankhurst, Gelawdewos' Confession helped his fellow Ethiopian Christians to remain "steadfast in their adherence to Sabbath observance, circumcision, and the prohibition against pork and other 'unclean' foods."

According to the Spanish Jesuit Pedro Páez, Gelawdewos' made his seat in Wej, where he built his capital on the plains near a mountain called Zef Bar. He said the city was not as well-designed or as grand as those in Europe, which had large stone buildings and magnificent palaces. Instead, many of the buildings looked more like simple huts than homes fit for an emperor. Most were small, round, and low, made of upright poles covered with mud and topped with straw roofs. Even the homes of important people were only slightly better, with some having stone and mud walls, stronger roofs, or a longer shape instead of being round. The grandest buildings was that of Gelawdewos', around two stories high, it was very miserable and considered unsuitable for an emperor.

== Campaigns ==
Following the Imam's death and defeat at Wanya Daga, the regions of Dawaro and Bali fell under the control of Vizier Abbas, the nephew of Imam Ahmad ibn Ibrahim. Abbas then launched a fierce attack on a number of Christian towns in Shewa. The young Emperor, Gelawdewos, made his way to confront him and Abbas rushed with his army to meet the Emperor. Gelawdewos was victorious in this engagement and Abbas with all his captains were killed. Galawdewos decided to remain in Wej where he established his capital, stationed his royal court and built a palace there. Gelawdewos then conquered all of the Muslim provinces except for Adal. Among the provinces he conquered were Dawaro, Fetegar, Bali, and Hadiya. The Ethiopian king then focused on the southwestern side of Ethiopia.

In early 1548, Gelawdewos led his army in campaign to the western fringes of the Empire, perhaps in Bizamo, beyond the province of Damot, which was then inhabited by pagans. Whilst Gelawdewos was campaigning in the west, the Adalites would launch an invasion of Dawaro. Gelawdewos's vassal Fanu'el succeeded in repulsing him. Gelawdewos later arrived in the region where he took the offensive, he marched into the region of Adal where he took much loot, slaves, gold and sliver and was said to have distributed it most generously among his subjects before returning six months later. The Emperor then ordered Fanu’el to advance "into the country towards Zayla" where he reportedly killed two prominent Muslim leaders, however Nur ibn Mujahid was able to escape.

In late 1549, Gelawdewos followed up with another large scale invasion into Adal territory, and as the chronicler claims, “to ravage it like how the Muslims ravaged the Christian highlands”. He spent five months in this operation during which he freed numerous Christian slaves that had been taken during the Ethiopian-Adal War and in his turn enslaved many Muslim captives. He also captured ‘Abbas, one of the principal figures of Adal, although Emir Nur was able to escape once again.

After this campaign in the east, a number of revolts were suppressed, in Gumär, and Gambo provinces. During the Ottoman conquest of Habesh, the Ottomans under Özdemir Pasha attacked seized Massawa, Arqiqo and Dahlak. Gelawdewos relied on the resistance of the local population. In the area of Bur, the farmers killed many Turks and their commander, sending the latter's head to the Emperor.

In 1559, Nur ibn Mujahid invaded Fatagar again with a force comprising 1800 horsemen and 500 riflemen, and numerous sword and bow-wielding troops. To face that threat, Gelawdewos ordered Ras Hamalmal of Kambata and Ras Fasil to lead two armies against Harar, the capital city of the Adal Sultanate. The two commanders successfully sacked Harar and killed Barakat ibn Umar Din, the last member of the Walasma dynasty. Galawdewos then led his own troops, hastily assembled. On 23 March 1559, the imperial army met Nur ibn Mujahid force in the Battle of Fatagar at a place named Nech Sar, where, according to a Harari chronicle, Gelawdewos was killed in battle. "Early in the engagement Galawdéwos was hit by a bullet, but continued to fight until surrounded by a score of Harari cavalry, who struck him fatally to the ground with their spears," according to Pankhurst. Galawdewos was surrounded by about twenty horsemen who pierced his loin with a lance

Emir Nur had the Emperor's head sent to the country of Sa'ad ad-Din II, then rode off to plunder Ethiopian territory before returning home. The explorer Richard Francis Burton tells a slightly different account, adding that Gelawdewos had been supervising the restoration of Debre Werq when he received a message from Emir Nur challenging him to combat. When the Emperor met the Emir, a priest warned that the angel Gabriel had told him Gelawdewos would needlessly risk his life—which caused most of the Ethiopian army to flee.

According to G. W. B. Huntingford, Gelawdewos' body was buried at Tadbaba Maryam near Sayint and his head, which was brought back to Ethiopia by some traders, was buried in Ensaqya (now in Antsokiyana Gemza) in the Tomb of Saint Gelawdewos.

== Family ==
Gelawdewos had no sons, but had two daughters named Sabana Giyorgis and Mashihawit.

Regnal titles
Preceded by Dawit II	Emperor of Ethiopia; 1540–1559	Succeeded by Menas
