= Battle of Addi Qarro =

Battle between Ethiopia and the Ottoman Empire

- Part of Ottoman–Ethiopian War (1557–1589)
Date	December 1578; 447 years ago
Location	Addi Qarro, Tigray, Ethiopian Empire
Result	Ethiopian victory

Belligerents
Ethiopian Empire	Ottoman Empire; Medri Bahri rebels

Commanders and leaders
Sarsa Dengel	Ahmad Pasha †; Bahr Negus Yeshaq †

Strength
Unknown	1,000 janissaries Numerous footmen and Cavalry; 8 cannons

Casualties and losses
Unknown	Most of the army killed 300 Turks captured 8 cannons captured

The Battle of Addi Qarro also called the Battle of Addi Ye'Qorro (ግጥም ዓዲ ይዕቖሮ) was a battle that took place between forces of the Ethiopian Empire and forces of the Ottoman Empire in December 1578 in the Tigray Province of the Ethiopian Empire. The forces of the Ethiopian Empire were led by the Emperor Sarsa Dengel while the forces of the Ottoman Empire were led by Ahmad pasha, beylerbey of habeş, supplemented by troops of Bahr Negus Yeshaq who was in rebellion against the emperor at the time. The battle followed an earlier Ethiopian victory over the Ottomans at Enticaw (Enticho) on November 13 of the same year and resulted in the liquidation of the invading Ottoman army.

== Battle ==
Prior to the battle, Sarsa Dengel replied to Yeshaq stating "you may come to me with the Turks, (but) I will come to you with Christ my savior" (Rossini, 1961-62:56). In any case, Yeshaq was struck to death by a spear, and Ahmed Pasha was beheaded (Rossini, 1961-62: 74-75). The victory sealed the restoration of Debarwa from the occupation of the Ottoman Turks (Rossini, 1961-62: 76; Gent, 1682: 175-176; Bruce, 1792:234; Orhonlu, 1974: 57).

The battle took place at Addi Qarro, located in the Tigray province of the Ethiopian Empire. The Ethiopian Forces of the Emperor attacked the Ottomans in two columns with the Emperor as commander-in-chief. The right column was led by Takla Gigorgis while the left was led by Dahragot, governor of Tigray. The two commanders charged into the Ottoman center and managed to break it, capturing the enemies' war drums. Yeshaq attempted to retreat at this point accompanied by 30 Ottoman horsemen. However, he was noticed by an Ethiopian warrior named Takla Yohannes who ambushed and fatally wounded him. Yeshaq managed to straggle back to his troops and died a few hours later.

The Ottomans managed to dribble into the Emperor's camp in small numbers at some point, however, as the battle progressed, they found themselves in disarray and surrounded on all sides by the Emperor's troops who proceeded to shoot, pierce and cut them down. Ahmad Pasha was pierced with a spear to the breast by a warrior named Yona'el.

The defeat was sudden and crushing for the Ottomans whose army was liquidated. The severed heads of Ahmad Pasha and Yeshaq were paraded at orders of the Emperor.

== Aftermath ==
After the battle, Sarsa Dengel and his victorious army advanced on the Ottoman fort at Debarwa, captured it and destroyed the fort along with the mosque which was built by the Ottomans. With his victories at this and the subsequent battles Sarsa Dengel ended the Turkish threat to the independence of his Empire while also restoring the powerful position of the Ethiopian Emperor in the region.

Some of the captured Turks were absorbed into the army of the Emperor after being Christianized. They formed a part of the Emperor's army that stormed the mountain strongholds of the Jewish rebel Gushan. Their descendants would also form a special part of the Ethiopian army which remained attached to the Imperial Court.
