= Rema Island =

Island in Ethiopia

Rema Island is a small island located in the southeastern part of Lake Tana in Ethiopia. It has a latitude and longitude of 11°48′N 37°27′E.

== Overview ==
It is the location of the church of Medhane Alem, where the Emperor Sarsa Dengel is interred. When R.E. Cheesman visited the church in March 1933, he found some paintings which he described as "beautiful", suggesting European artists or monks who had studied in Palestine. Two triptychs in particular retained good colors, with "the old gold background and reds are superb and look like lacquer." Cheesman was also shown a blue-and-white porcelain jar, in which Sarsa Dengel's entrails were brought from the place of his death.
