= Yeshaq (Bahr Negus) =

16th century Bahr Negasi (ruler)

Yeshaq (died 1578) was the Bahr Negus during the mid to late 16th century. A subordinate of Ethiopian Emperor Dawit II, he was noted for supporting Gelawdewos and rebelling against his successors during the Ottoman conflict.

== Reign ==
Bahr Negasi Yeshaq first appears in history about the time the Portuguese fleet arrived at Massawa in 1541. When Christovão da Gama marched inland with his 400 matchlockmen, Yeshaq not only provided him provisions and places to camp in his realm, but also about 500 soldiers and information about the land. The father of the Bahr Negash, who had despaired of the rightful Emperor being restored to power and had come to be a valuable supporter of Ahmed ibn Ibrahim al-Ghazi, sought pardon from Gelawdewos, offering Imam Ahmad's son in exchange; despite the Emperor's anger at the man's betrayal, out of respect for the Bahr Negasi, who had provided critical help in getting the Portuguese expedition into Ethiopia, Gelawdewos consented to the offer. The Bahr Negasi also joined Emperor Gelawdewos in the decisive Battle of Wayna Daga, where Ahmad ibn Ibrahim al-Ghazi, the leader of the Adal Sultanate, was killed and his forces scattered.

=== Initial resistance to the Ottomans ===
When the Ottoman general Özdemir Pasha, who had been made governor of the Ottoman province of Habesh, crossed over from Jeddah in 1557 and occupied Massawa, Arqiqo and finally Debarwa, the residence of the Bahr Negasi, Yeshaq initially resisted the Ottoman advance. A local Muslim ruler, GaŸéwa of Mäzäga, sent her nephew Habem ibn Dilado to collaborate with the Turks and invade Yeshaq's territory, but he was defeated and captured by Yeshaq. Yeshaq then pushed the Ottomans back to the coast entirely. Özdemir subsequently allied with GaŸéwa and marched toward Mäzäga, but fell gravely ill along with many of his troops. The Turks and GaŸéwa attempted to retreat to Massawa but were attacked and massacred by locals along the way. Reinforced by a massive army dispatched by Emperor Gelawdewos, the Abyssinian forces scored a further victory against the invaders, recapturing Debarwa and seizing the "immense treasure" the invaders had accumulated within.

=== Rebellion against Menas ===
Although Bahr Negasi Yeshaq enjoyed good relations with Emperor Gelawdewos, his relations with his successors were far more hostile. Following Menas's accession, Yeshaq rebelled and, exploiting noble discontent with the new emperor's policies, proclaimed a rival claimant to the throne. Defeated by Menas in an initial confrontation, Yeshaq then reversed his earlier opposition to the Ottomans and accepted Ottoman overlordship, ceding the town of Debarwa to the Ottomans in exchange for military support. Özdemir Pasha, the long-serving Ottoman governor of Ethiopia, had died in 1557 and could not have been party to this arrangement. Debarwa subsequently became the centre of a new Ottoman administrative district called Dawarya, with a fortress and mosques constructed there; Ottoman coins were struck at Debarwa dated 1566–67, demonstrating the depth of Ottoman penetration into the highlands. Yeshaq's forces, with the help of their Ottoman allies, defeated Emperor Menas at Enderta on 20 April 1562. Menas was forced to flee to the mountains and died from an illness the following year.

=== Defeat and death ===
When Sarsa Dengel, the son of Menas, succeeded to the throne, Yeshaq at first pledged his loyalty. The Chronicle of King Śarḍa Dǝngǝl, in which Yeshaq is referred to by the imperial military title ʾazmāč, records that as part of the reconciliation he met with two royal women in ʾAbbāwi, one of whom was Wayzaro ʾAmata Giyorgis, Sarsa Dengel's paternal aunt; the second woman is not named in the text. Within a few years, however, Yeshaq once more went into rebellion, finding allies in both the Ottomans and the ruler of Harar, Sultan Muhammad ibn Nasir. The Chronicle of Śarḍa Dǝngǝl records that Yeshaq's plot to enthrone a rival claimant, Tazkāro, was undertaken in alliance with another provincial governor named Kǝflo. Sarsa Dengel captured and razed the Ottoman fort at Debarwa in 1576, before launching a decisive campaign in November 1578. Rather than storming Yeshaq's well-fortified capital directly, Sarsa Dengel's strategy was to threaten the home villages of Yeshaq's Tigrayan soldiers, forcing them to desert. The campaign lasted from 10 November to 26 December 1578. On 13 November Yeshaq and his Ottoman allies put the imperial army to flight, but Sarsa Dengel did not retreat. A second inconclusive battle on 17 November saw Yeshaq's vassals begin to defect to the Emperor. The final battle on 26 December routed Yeshaq's army. Yeshaq fled but was wounded and returned to die in battle. The Ottoman pasha was also killed in the same engagement. Debarwa was lost by the Ottomans in December 1578, ending their presence in the Ethiopian highlands. Richard Pankhurst concurs with the judgement of James Bruce on Yeshaq, who points out that the status of the Bahr Negasi "was much diminished by Yeshaq's treachery. From then onwards the governor of the provinces beyond the Tekezé was not allowed the sandaq (Banner) and nagarit (War Drum), and no longer had a place in Council unless especially called on by the Emperor."

== Notes ==
=== Bibliography ===
Pankhurst, Richard (1961). An Introduction to the Economic History of Ethiopia, from Early Times to 1800. Lalibela House.
