= Debre Werq =

Town in Amhara Region, Ethiopia

- Town
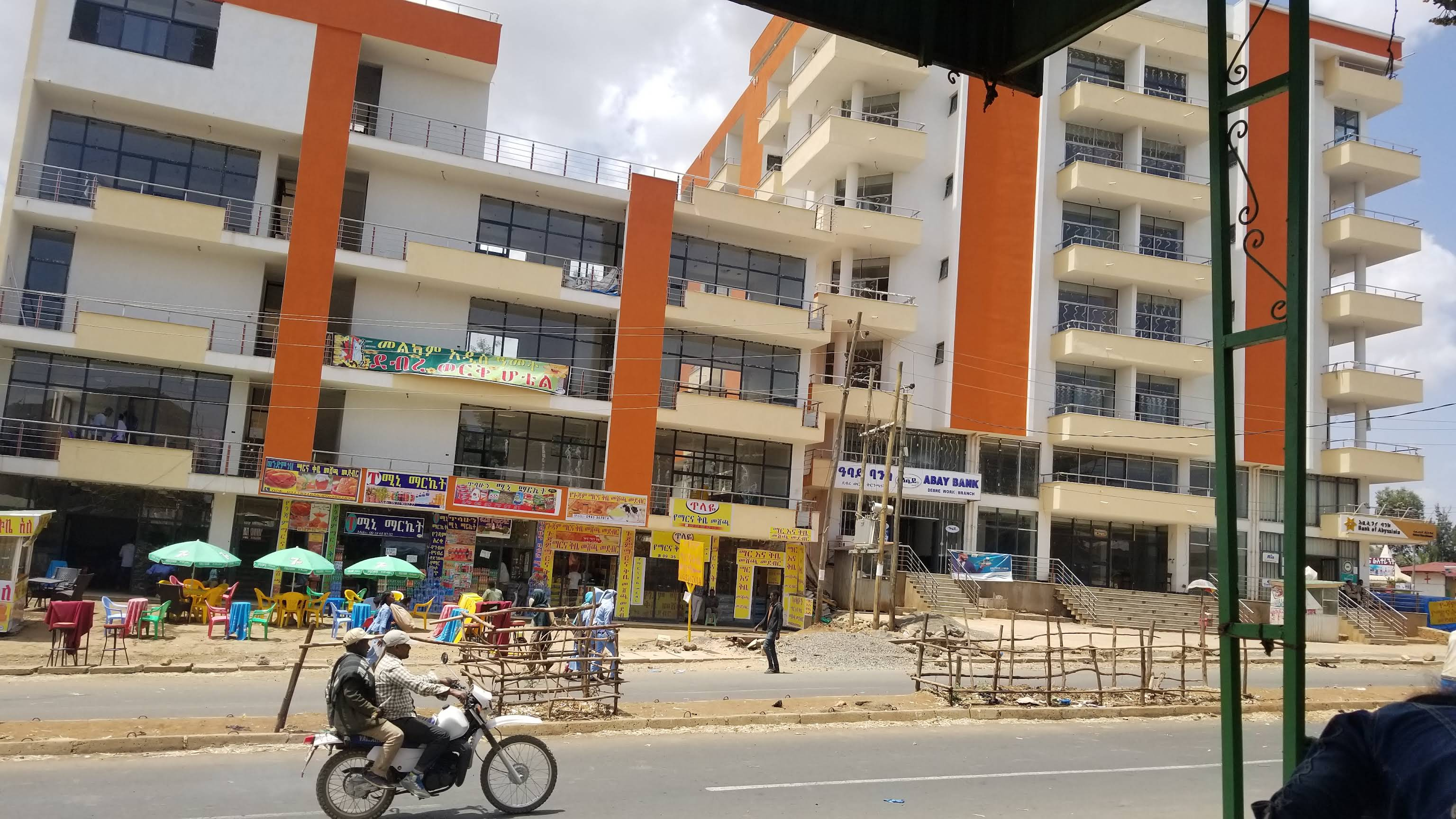
- A street in Debre Werq.

- Location in Ethiopia
- Coordinates: 10°40′N 38°10′E
- Country: Ethiopia
- Region: Amhara
- Zone: East Gojjam
- Elevation: 2,489 m (8,166 ft)

Population (2005)
  - Total: 13,908 (est)
- Time zone: UTC+3 (EAT)

Debre Werq (Amharic: ደብረ ወርቅ) is a small town in western Ethiopia. Located in the East Gojjam of the Amhara Region, it has a latitude and longitude of 6°52′N 35°31′E with an elevation of 2489 meters above sea level. The settlement is known for its church and a hilltop monastery dedicated to the Virgin Mary, around which the community grew. It is the larger of two towns in Enarj Enawga woreda.

== History ==
An early mention of Debre Werq is during the reign of 1559 when, according to explorer Richard Francis Burton, the emperor Mar Gelawdewos had been supervising its restoration. Around 1620, the Tulema Oromo were said to have devastated Gojjam as far as Debre Werq. Its next mention is in 1684, in an itinerary of Emperor Iyasu I. Cardinal Guglielmo Massaia met with Ras Ali II here in the mid-19th century, describing the town as sitting on a round hill with the church at its summit; the town encircling the church almost extended down to the base of the hill. A debtera, who was head of the church, also appeared to be the civil head of the town. Charles Beke, who visited Debre Werq 25 April 1842, described the town was not only located "on a conical eminence", located the hill at "the fork of two small streams Tazza and Zinjut." (Both of these streams are tributaries of the Chee.)

Paul B. Henze describes visiting the church at Debre Werq in the early 1970s, an event which included finding the church being rebuilt from the foundations, and an unpleasant encounter with a monk over wanting to view the church's collection of manuscripts.

== Demographics ==
Based on figures from the Central Statistical Agency in 2005, Debre Werq has an estimated total population of 13,908, of whom 6,643 are men and 7,265 are women. The 1994 census reported this town had a total population of 8,048 of whom 3,495 were men and 4,553 were women.
