= Sarsa Dengel =

Emperor of Ethiopia from 1563 to 1597

Sarsa Dengel ዐፄ ሠርጸ ድንግል
- Negusa Nagast
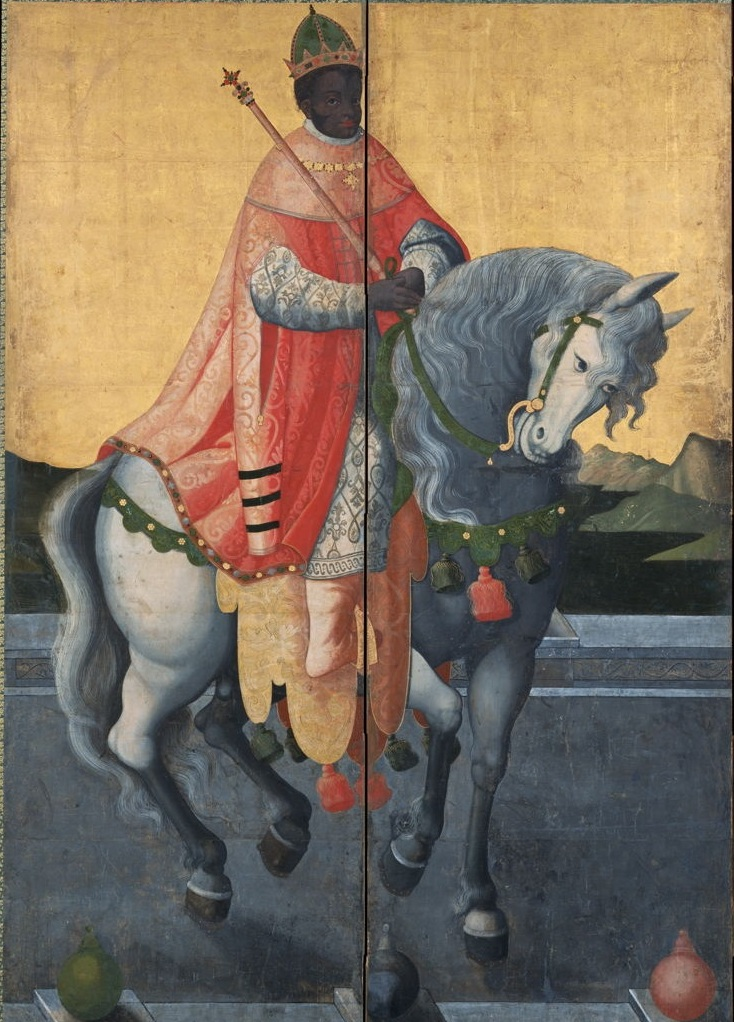
- "King of Abyssinia" (Sarsa Dengel) based on Portuguese descriptions to a Japanese Momoyama Nanban painter

Emperor of Ethiopia
- Reign: 1563–1597
- Predecessor: Menas
- Successor: Yaqob
- Born: 1550
- Died: 4 October 1597 (aged 46–47); Damot
- Issue: Yaqob
Regnal name
- Malak Sagad I
- Dynasty: Solomonic dynasty
- Father: Menas
- Mother: Admas Mogasa
- Religion: Ethiopian Orthodox

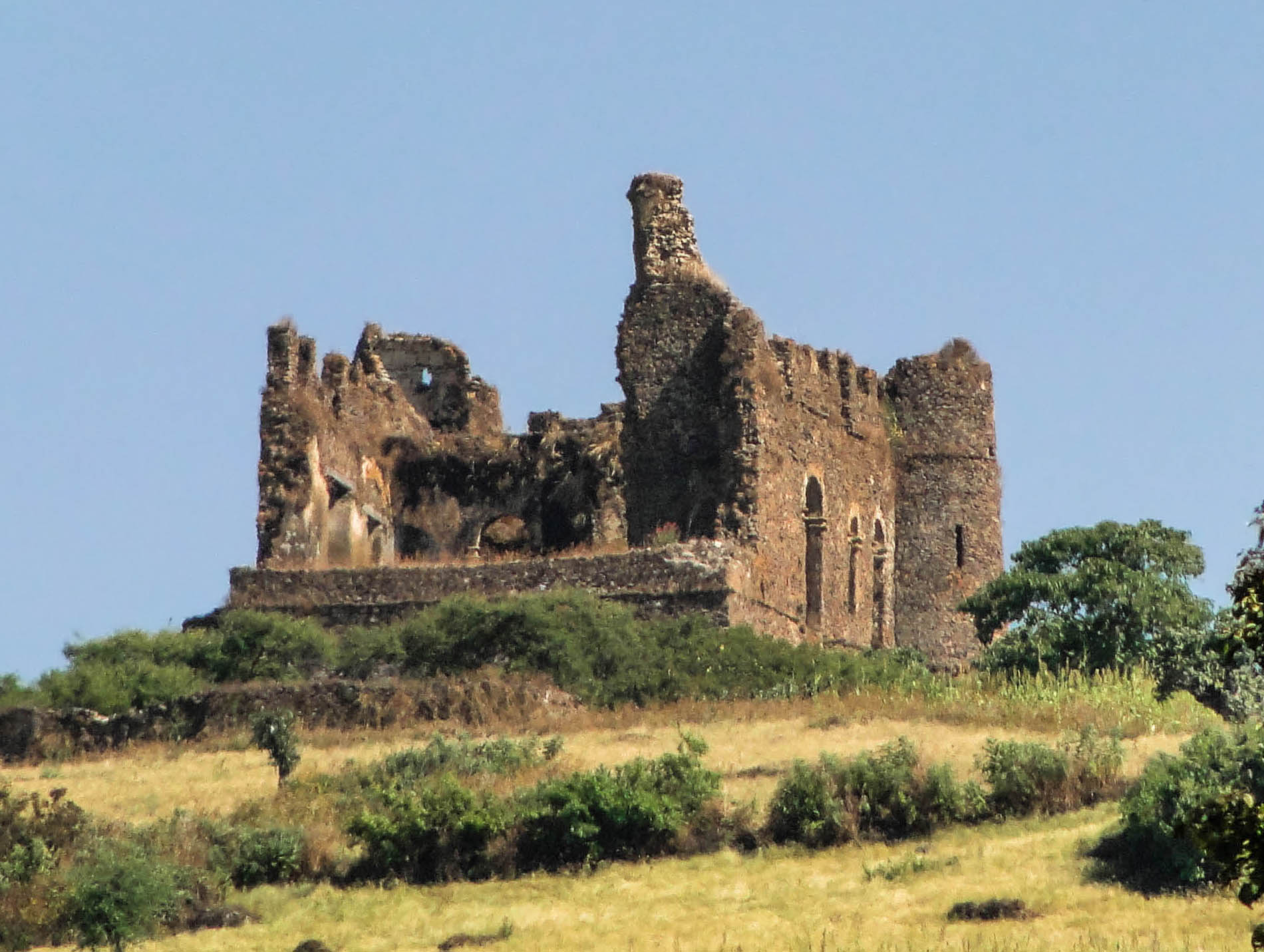
The ruins of the Guzara castle in Enfraz, a precursor to the palaces of Gonder. Likely built by Emperor Sarsa Dengel to celebrate his defeat of the Ottomans, but also attributed to his father, Menas of Ethiopia

Sarsa Dengel (Ge'ez: ሠርጸ ድንግል śärṣä dəngəl; 1550 – 4 October 1597), also known as Sarsa the Great, was Emperor of Ethiopia, and a member of the Solomonic dynasty. His throne name was Malak Sagad I (መለክ ሰገድ malak sagad). He is considered one of the greatest warrior-kings of the Ethiopian Empire.

Sarsa Dengel, the son of Emperor Menas and Empress Admas Mogasa, was elected king at the age of 14. As ruler, he faced several revolts and moved the empire's center from Shewa to Begemder. Sarsa Dengel fought against the Ottomans, defeating regional ruler Bahr Negus Yeshaq and Adal Sultan Muhammad V. He also repelled the Turkish invaders in Debarwa and Hirgigo. In addition, Sarsa Dengel led campaigns against the Oromo tribes who were migrating northward, successfully pushing them back. Despite his military successes, historians argue that his focus on northern campaigns instead of addressing the Oromo expansion in the south ultimately led to the decline of the Ethiopian Empire.

== Biography ==
=== Accession to the Throne ===
The son of Emperor Menas and Empress Admas Mogasa, Sarsa Dengel was elected king by the Shewan commanders of the army and the Dowager Empress. He was barely fourteen years old. Upon his coming of age, Sarsa Dengel had to put down a number of revolts: such as his cousin Hamalmal in 1563 at the Battle of Endagabatan, and another by his cousin Fasil two years later.

=== Campaigns ===
In the 1570s several Oromo tribes had begun migrating north towards Abyssinia. In 1572 Sarsa Dengel fought off a raid by the Borana Oromo under a luba named Ambissa near Lake Zway. In 1574, upon learning that the Oromo had conquered the province of Wej, the Emperor assembled his forces from across Ethiopia to create an army at Gind Beret. From there, Sarsa Dengel headed south and discovered that the Oromo had also seized Maya. Sarsa Dengel successfully defeated the Oromo, compelling them to flee toward Fatager.

He later learned that the Adal Sultan, Muhammad ibn Nasir, had launched a Jihad and was campaigning in Hadiya. Subsequently, he confronted the Adalite army at the Battle of Webi River, where he decisively defeated them. In the battle, the Emperor captured the Sultan and executed him along with most of the Adalite nobility, thereby ending Adal as a military power in the region.

When the Ottomans withdrew from Debarwa, the local ruler Yeshaq promptly seized the opportunity to occupy it and forge an alliance with the Turks. Sarsa Dengel, angered by what he perceived as his vassal's arrogance and betrayal, marched against them in 1577. He defeated and liquidated the combined army of the Ottoman Empire and their rebellious allies at the Battle of Addi Qarro in Tigray, where he killed the Ottoman commander Ahmad Pasha along with the rebellious Bahr Negus Yeshaq. The victorious Emperor then advanced on Debarwa whereupon the Turkish garrison surrendered with all its firearms. Sarsa Dengel then seized the vast riches stored by the Turks in Debarwa and ordered the destruction of the mosque and the fort erected during the Ottoman occupation. The chronicler, who was greatly impressed by the Emperor's military victories exclaims: "Who among the kings of Ethiopia has defeated the Turkish army supplied with rifles and cannons? None has seen or heard of the victories of King Malak Sagad!"

Upon defeating the Turks, Sarsa Dengel then held his coronation at Aksum and in 1580 he departed from Tigray to conduct a campaign against the Beta Israel in Semien province. While on this campaign, Sarsa Dengel received information that the Borana Oromo were attacking the provinces of Shewa, Waj, and Damot. Despite this, Sarsa Dengel declined to defend these territories against the Oromos and instead continued to focus his attention on the Beta Israel. This decision generated considerable frustration among his officials but the Emperor justified his action by stating: "It is better for me that I fight with the enemies of the blood of Jesus Christ [i.e. Jews] than go to fight against the Galla."

Under luba Mul'eta the Borana Oromo crossed the Abay and invaded Gojjam in 1586, it was during this raid that the future Emperor Susenyos I would be captured by the Oromos. Sarsa Dengel then took the initiative against the Oromo in the south, where he forced the Dawé Oromo in Wej to flee south. Bahrey praised Sarsa Dengel's campaign, stating that he "did not act according to the custom of the kings his ancestors, who, when making war were in the habit of sending their troops ahead, remaining themselves in the rear with the pick of their cavalry and infantry, praising those who went forward bravely and punishing those who lagged behind."

In 1587, the Turks left the port of Hirgigo and advanced inland to take Debarwa again. The Turks defeated the governor of Hamasien who fled to Tigray. Upon hearing this, Sarsa Dengel mobilized his forces and crossed the Mereb river to repel the Turkish invaders who were pillaging the countryside. He advanced to Debarwa and then launched a raid on the Ottoman fort at Hirgigo where he killed the Ottoman commander Kadawert Pasha. The Turks then gave a peace offering to the Emperor and withdrew from Hirgigo, handing it over to a local Balaw chief.

On his final campaign against the Oromo in Damot, his Chronicle records, a group of monks tried to dissuade him from this expedition; failing that, they warned him not to eat fish from a certain river he would pass. Despite their warning, when he passed by the river the monks warned him about, he ate fish taken from this river and grew sick and died..

His body was interred in Medhane Alem church on Rema Island. When Robert Ernest Cheesman visited the church in March 1933, he was shown a blue-and-white porcelain jar, which his entrails were brought from the place of his death.

== Legacy ==
Historian J. Spencer Trimingham hails Sarsa Dengel as one of the greatest warrior-kings to rule the Ethiopian Empire. According to Paul B. Henze, Sarsa Dengel's reorganization of the Ethiopian army led to his successful defense of the empire from enemies in all directions. German historian Franz Dombrowski credits Sarsa Dengel with ending the Ottoman threat to the independence of his Empire and restoring the powerful position of the Ethiopian Emperor in the region.

According to Professor Mordechai Abir: "the many historians who described Sersa Dangel as an able, heroic, and successful monarch completely distorted the truth." Abir argues that Sarsa Dengel's obsession to consolidate his government in the Beta Israel provinces in the north, instead of focusing all of his resources and attention in the south to stop the Oromo expansions, was a turning point in Ethiopian history. He describes the decision as "disastrous", arguing that it "opened the Ethiopian plateau for the Oromo migration and sparked off a chain of reaction which lead to the final decline of the Ethiopian Empire." The British historian Richard Pankhurst concurred, stating that Emperor Sarsa Dengel's victories in the far north against the Ottomans were achieved at the cost of abandoning effective resistance against the Oromo invasion from the south.

Robert Silverberg, however, argues that Sarsa Dengel died in 1597 having enlarged the realm he inherited. Silverberg further calls the Emperor a valiant warrior and refers to his time on the throne as "the 35 triumphant years" during which Sarsa Dengel scored several decisive victories over his various enemies. He thus argues that Sarsa Dengel left the Ethiopian Empire much stronger and larger than he found it at the time of his accession to the throne.

Regnal titles
Preceded by Menas	Emperor of Ethiopia; 1563–1597	Succeeded by Yaqob
