= Battle of Wayna Daga =

Major battle of the Ethiopian-Adal war

- Part of the Ethiopian–Adal War, Ottoman–Portuguese conflicts (1538–57) and Somali–Portuguese conflicts
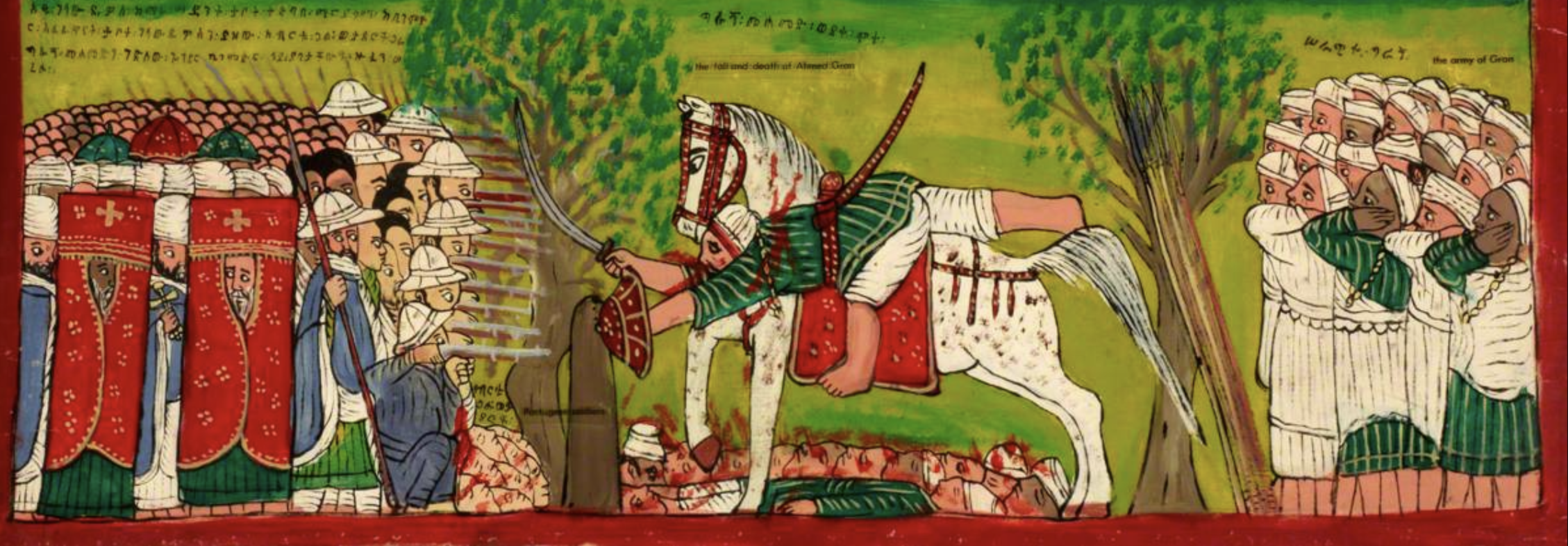
- Early 20th century folk drawing of Ahmed's death; the Portuguese musketeers are anachronistically wearing pith helmets.
Date	21 February 1543; 483 years ago
Location	near Lake Tana, Ethiopia
Result	Ethiopian–Portuguese victory

Belligerents
Ethiopian Empire; Portuguese Empire	Adal Sultanate; Ottoman Empire

Commanders and leaders
Gelawdewos	Ahmad ibn Ibrahim †

Strength
8,000 infantry 500 cavalry 70 Portuguese arquebusiers 60 Portuguese cavalry	14,000 infantry 1,200 cavalry 200 Ottoman arquebusiers

Casualties and losses
Unknown; 4 Portuguese killed	Extensive; over half of the army killed or captured 160 Ottomans killed

The Battle of Wayna Daga was a large-scale battle between the Ethiopian forces and the Portuguese Empire and the forces of the Adal Sultanate and the Ottoman Empire in the east of Lake Tana in Ethiopia on 21 February 1543. The available sources give different dates for the battle. Led by the Emperor Galawdewos, the combined army of Ethiopian and Portuguese troops defeated the Adal-Ottoman army led by Imam Ahmad ibn Ibrahim al-Ghazi. Imam Ahmad was killed in the battle and his followers were utterly routed

== Background ==
At the Battle of Wofla (28 August 1542) Imam Ahmad crushed the Portuguese expeditionary force, killing most of its men, capturing practically all of the firearms they had, and capturing and killing its leader, Cristóvão da Gama. The Imam enjoyed a decisive victory over his greatest foe; armies in the Horn of Africa melted away with the death of their leaders. He then reduced the number of mercenary Ottoman arquebusiers to 200, and relying on his own forces retired to Emfraz near Lake Tana for the coming rainy season. Miguel de Castanhoso states that these arquebusiers left his service because they were upset that he beheaded da Gama, whom they wanted to present to the Ottoman emperor. However, Beckingham notes that a Hadhrami chronicle states that some of them threatened the Imam's life unless he gave them 10,000 ounces of gold, to which he "gave a very favorable reply". When the rest of the group learned of their success, they came to the Imam and made a similar demand; deciding that he had no further need of their services, he sent them home giving them 2,000 ounces of gold.

However, de Gama had inspired a fierce loyalty in his surviving followers, all but 50 of whom had reassembled after their defeat around Queen Seble Wongel, and taken refuge at "The Mountain of the Jews", which Whiteway identifies as Amba Sel. Castanhoso, writing decades after the fact, states that after the Emperor Gelawdewos had joined the survivors, and seeing the number of men who flocked to the Emperor's standard, at Christmas "we went to the Preste, and begged him to help us avenge the death of Dom Christovão." Gelawdewos agreed to march against the Imam. The Portuguese firearms which had been stored at Debre Damo were produced. A message was sent to a company of Portuguese soldiers who had proceeded to Debarwa to find passage home, but they failed to respond in time for the coming battle.

The allied forces spent the following months marching the provinces before heading to Imam Ahmad's camp next to Lake Tana. On 13 February 1543, they defeated a group of cavalry and infantry led by the Imam's lieutenant Sayid Mehmed in Wogera (roughly corresponding to the modern woreda of the same name), killing Sayid Mehmed. From the prisoners it was learned that the Imam was camped only five days' march away at Deresgue, and flush with victory the army marched to confront their enemy.

== Location ==
As with many of the battles in Castanhoso's narrative, published 20 years after the events they describe, the exact location where the two forces encountered one another is not known. General histories of Ethiopia are vague: Paul B. Henze, in his Layers of Time, implies the battlefield was near Lake Tana, and in a footnote states that much of the combat activity at this time "would seem to have been in Gaynt", the former province located southeast of Lake Tana. Richard Pankhurst in The Ethiopian: A History places the engagement in "Western Bagemder", which covered the area corresponding to the contemporary Debub Gondar Zone. Lastly, the name itself is of little help: "Wayna Daga" is the traditional Amharic word for the climatic regions between the higher, mountainous "Daga" elevations (2,600 meters above sea level and above) and the lowland "Qolla" elevations (between 1,400 and 2,000 meters above sea level). Most of the lands around Lake Tana fall into this middle climatic region.

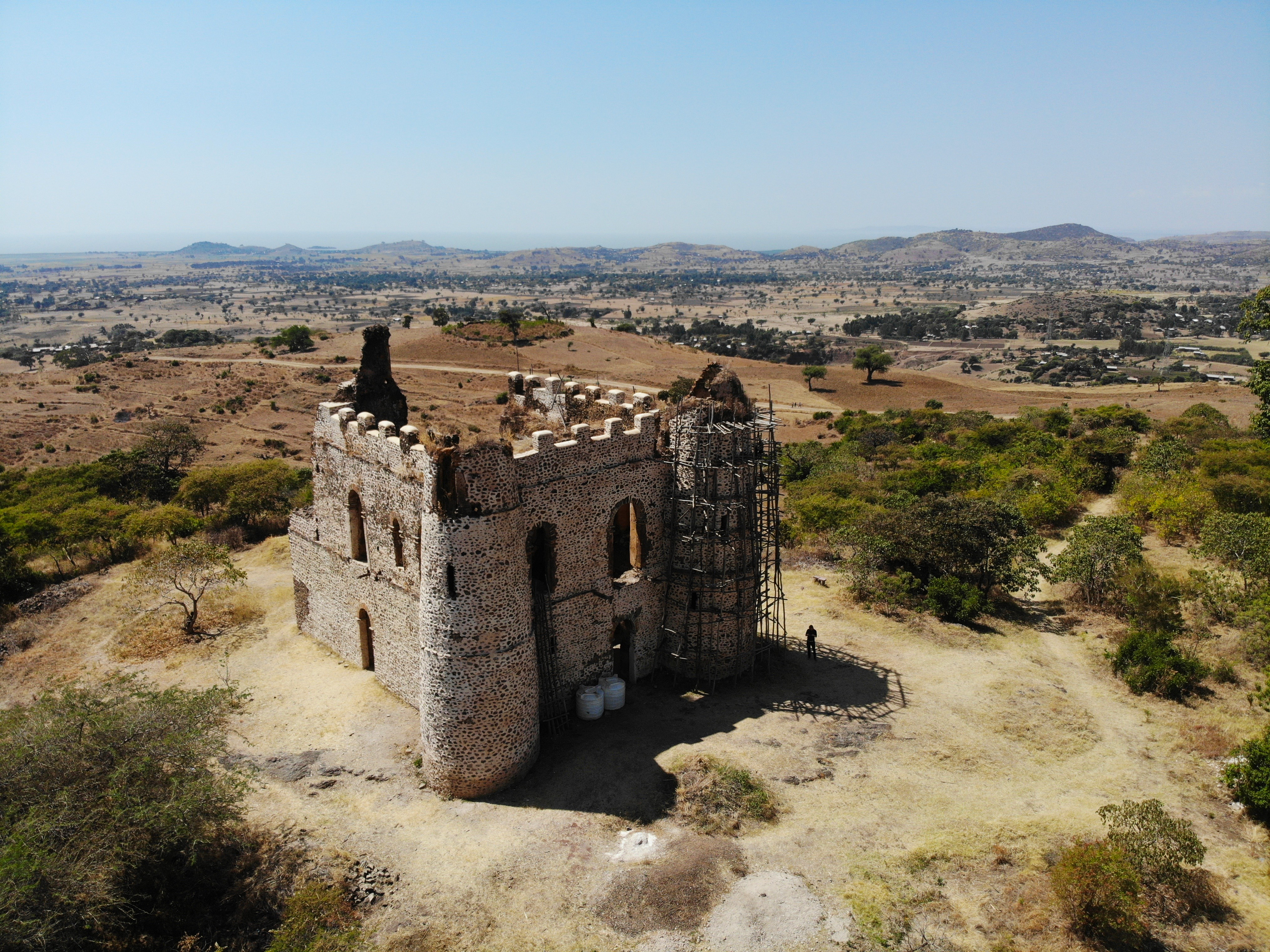
Geography around Lake Tana.

Whiteway, in his introduction to Castanhoso's account, discusses the evidence he was able to compile for its location. Castanhoso himself does not name the place; it was Pedro Páez who first provided the name of "Wayna Daga". Paez's younger contemporary, Jerónimo Lobo, locates the battle at a place called Granhi Berr Jaaf Granhi, or "Granhi's Gate, Granhi's Tree"; Lobo was told the locale acquired this name when Imam Ahmad, finding himself mortally wounded in the battle, "in great pain and rage, took the unsheathed scimitar with which he was fighting and struck a blow on the trunk of a tree near him". Lobo adds that he was shown the place, tree and mark. James Bruce, travelling south of Dengel Ber over three centuries later, mentions passing "the small village of Waindega, famous for the decisive battle fought between King Claudius and the Moor Gragne", adding in a footnote that the village was "otherwise called Graneber." However, as Whiteway points out, "The difficulty that presents itself to my mind is, to understand by what possible strategy one army starting from Darasgue, and the other from Woggera, neither desiring to avoid an engagement, and both starting-places being north of Lake Tzana, the decisive battle could have taken place at its south-west corner." Bruce may have been of the same mind, for earlier in his lengthy account of Ethiopian history, when he recounts the Battle of Wayna Daga Bruce appears to indicate the two armies fought at the north-east corner of the lake. Whiteway notes that two explorers, Combes and Tamisier, who crossed the mountainous country north-east of Lake Tana in 1835 call that region "Ouenadega" or Wayna Daga, and he concludes his discussion by locating the battle there.

== Battle ==
Once the Ethiopian army found the army of Imam Ahmad, they set up camp nearby; Emperor Gelawedewos advised against engaging the enemy right away, hoping that the 50 missing Portuguese soldiers would arrive soon as "in that country fifty Portuguese are a greater reinforcement than one thousand natives." Over the following days, each camp proceeded to harass the other with cavalry raids. The allied side had the better of the exchange, keeping their opponents from venturing from their camp for supplies, until the Imam's camp managed to kill the leading Ethiopian soldier, Azmach (Fitawrari) Keflo, which demoralized the Ethiopian troops. Faced with the potential desertion of his force, Galawedewos decided he could wait no longer and prepared for an assault the next day.

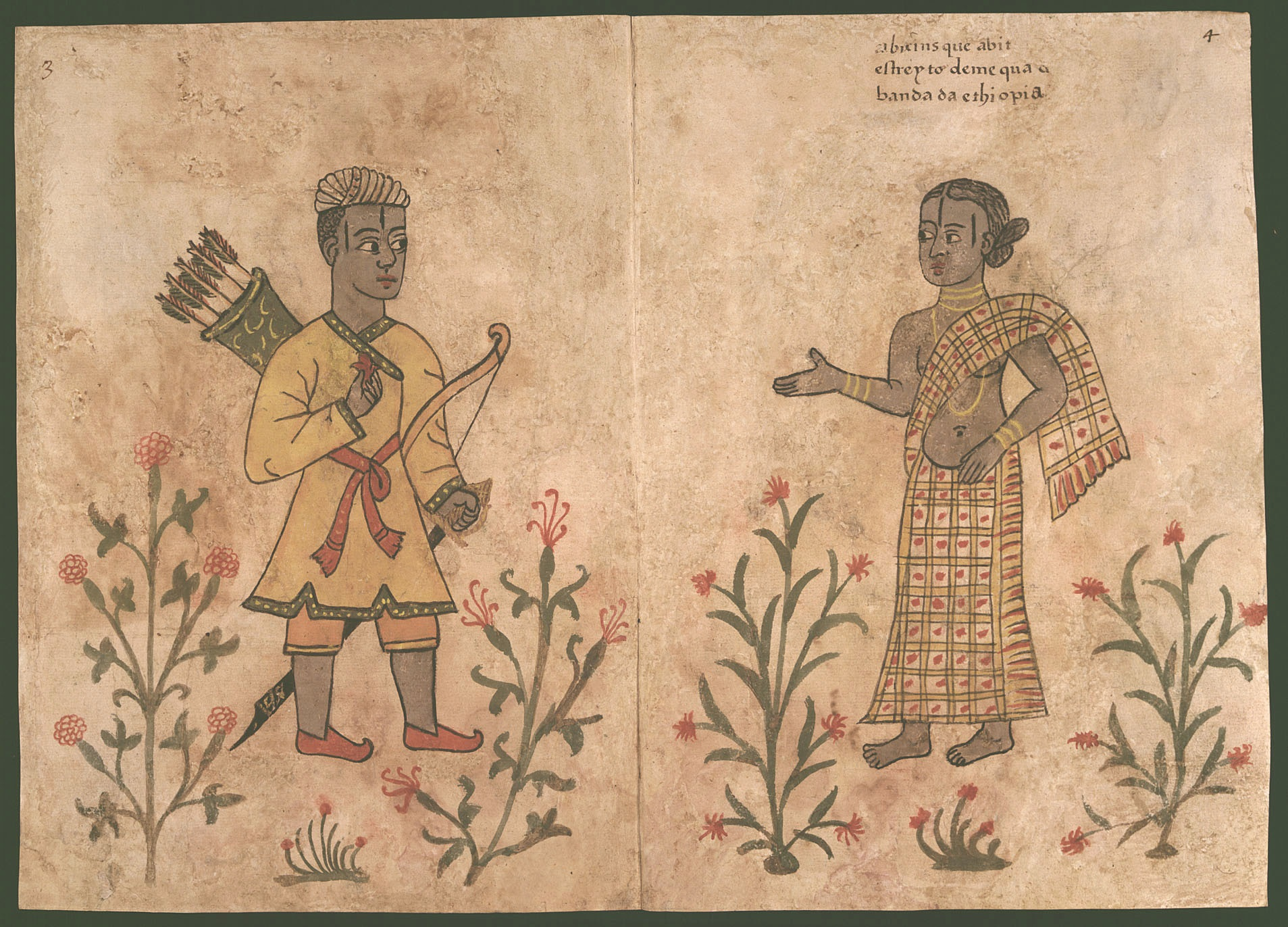
Portuguese depiction of an Ethiopian foot-soldier and his wife.

The two forces started the main battle early the next day, with the Ethiopian-Portuguese force divided into two groups. In the front was the Portuguese with 250 Abyssinian cavalrymen and 3,500 infantry, which were led by a Portuguese mulatto named Ayres Dias; in the rear was the Emperor Gelawdewos with another 250 cavalrymen and all the rest of the footmen. The Adal-Ottoman force also advanced in two groups, the Imam Ahmad in person in the front, with 200 Turkish matchlockmen and 600 cavalrymen and 7,000 infantry. Those in the front attacked on both flanks; in the rear was his commander, named Guanca Grade (Garad) with 600 cavalrymen and 7,000 infantry, who like the front attacked heavily. The Portuguese, seeing that the Muslims were prevailing, charged them, slaying many and driving the rest back; the Abyssinians, ashamed to see them fight alone, threw themselves in so vigorously that they left a "track as they went". The Imam, seeing his men lose ground, moved up to encourage them, with his son at his side. According to Portuguese sources, it was here that the Imam was hit by a bullet to his chest which threw him from his horse, although the sources differ in how he died.

According to Castanhoso, the Imam came so near to the lines that he was recognized by the Portuguese arquebusiers, who directed their combined firepower at him, and one of the arquebuses in the group fired the shot. Although he was an eyewitness to the battle, Castanhoso constantly emphasizes in his account the corporate identity of the Portuguese expedition after Gama's death: "We bore before us the banner of Holy Compassion (Sancta Misericordia); the Preste had sought to appoint one of us Captain, but we desired none save the banner of himself to lead us, for it was not to be anticipated that we should follow another, having lost what we had lost." There is another tradition, at least as old as João Bermudes, and repeated by every other near-contemporary source (e.g., Gaspar Correia, Jerónimo Lobo), that gives the credit to one João de Castilho; João charged into the Adal troops so he could fire upon Ahmad Ibrahim at point-blank range, an audacious act resulting in his death. However, another contemporary Ethiopian source, although stresses the bravery of the foreign soldiers, denies them the glory of victory. The local chronicle claims that it was actually one of Gelawdewos’ own soldiers who killed the Imam, but it doesn't identify who that soldier was or how the Imam was killed.

Soon after this, some of the Muslims attempted to flee, while others tried to stop them, resulting in their hindrance of one another. Witnessing their disorder and confusion, the Portuguese attacked and killed many of them. Simultaneously, the army of Gelawdewos attacked the Muslim rear, leading to a devastating rout, the fleeing Muslims were pursued by the Ethiopians and Portuguese who cut them down as they ran back to their camp. The Portuguese mainly followed the Turks, as Castanhoso describes; "they could not glut their revenge", of the 200 Turks no more than 40 survived.

Imam Ahmad's wife Bati del Wambara managed to escape with the surviving Turks, 300 horsemen of her personal guard, and as much of the Imam's treasure as they could carry. The moment they left their camp, the victorious Ethiopian army poured in, slaughtering everyone they encountered except for women and children. Amongst the women were numerous Christian captives and, as Castanhoso tells the story, "some found sisters, others daughters, others their wives, and it was for them no small delight to see them delivered from captivity."

== Aftermath ==
According to both Castanhoso and the story of João de Castilho: at the end of the battle, when Emperor Galawedewos offered his sister's hand in marriage to the man who killed the Imam, one of his captains, Azmach Calite, a youth, presented the Imam's head as proof of the deed; but a subsequent investigation revealed that the Portuguese had mortally wounded him before the soldier had "finished killing him", "thus he did not give his sister to that man, nor did he reward the Portuguese, as it was not known who wounded him".

According to Bruce, there remained one enemy leader, Joram, with a sizable force still at large. Joram had driven Gelawdewos "from his hiding-place on Mount Tsalem, and forced him to cross the Tacazze on foot, with equal danger of being drowned or taken." Joram had been unable to join the Imam before the battle, and Emperor Gelawdewos learned he was hastening towards him, unaware that the battle had already been lost. Gelawdewos sent out a party who successfully ambushed him, "which closed the account of Claudius with his father's enemies."

The father of the Bahr Negash, who had despaired of the rightful Emperor being restored to power and had come to be a valuable supporter of the Imam, sought pardon from Gelawdewos, offering Imam Ahmad's son in exchange; despite the Emperor's anger at the man's betrayal, out of respect for the Bahr Negash, who had provided critical help in getting the Portuguese expedition into Ethiopia, Gelawdewos consented to the offer. The Imam's son later proved a useful prize, for he was later exchanged for the Emperor's own brother, Menas, who later succeeded Gelawdewos. A number of other Christians who had joined Imam Ahmed accompanied the Bahr Negash' father into camp, but not having the influence or bargaining chip he did, the Emperor ordered the execution of some of them. Other individuals who sought his safe-conduct, the Emperor Gelawdewos granted it, "for there were so many that had he ordered all to be killed, he would have remained alone."

By Easter (25 March), it became clear to Gelawdewos that he would not be able to make a circuit of his newly-won empire to impress his authority on all parts of it before the start of the rainy season, so he set up camp "three leagues away" in an unnamed location on the shores of Lake Tana. Once the rains had ended, Emperor Gelawdewos began the long task of consolidating his rule.

== Sources ==
- Miguel de Castanhoso (1902). Richard Stephen Whiteway (ed.). The Portuguese Expedition to Abyssinia in 1541-1543 as Narrated by Castanhoso. Hakluyt Society.
