= Özdemir Pasha =

Ottoman general

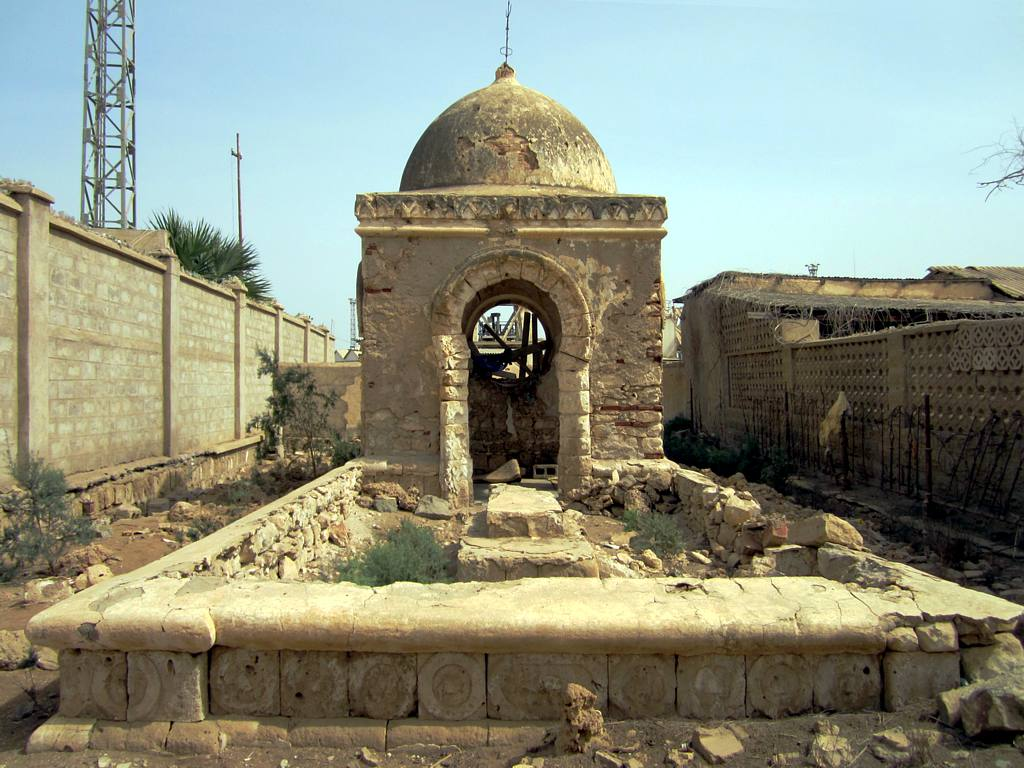
Tomb of Özdemir Pasha in Massawa

Özdemir Pasha (died 1560, Habesh Eyalet was a Mamluk general for the Ottoman Empire, of Kumyk Turkic or Circassian descent. He joined Hadım Süleyman Pasha's campaign to India in 1538 (see Ottoman naval expeditions in the Indian Ocean). Later he became the Ottoman governor of Yemen and invaded Nubia and Abyssinia. He fell ill while campaigning in Abyssinia and died in Debarwa in November, 1560.

== Campaigns in Yemen ==
In 1546 Üveys Pasha captured Ta’izz, however he was assassinated by his own men and Özdemir Pasha seized power. He captured Sana’a in 1547 and managed to capture Sa’da in 1548.

He was unable to defeat Mutahhar at Thula in 1552, however managed to sign an agreement in which Mutahhar recognised Ottoman suzerainty and maintained authority over Kawkaban and Thula. The following year, Özdemir Pasha established Ottoman authority over Rayma, Wusab, Utuma, Hubaysh and Kuhlan.

Özdemir Pasha was well-regarded for bringing some measure of stability in the otherwise difficult-to-govern Yemeni eyalet. Under his supervision, cities were garrisoned, fortresses were built and the trade routes were secured. His rule was cut short by his death in 1561 in Sanaa, Yemen.

== Campaigns in Abyssinia ==
In 1555 Özdemir Pasha led an expedition with 4,000 to 5,000 men and captured Sawakin and Massawa which fell in 1557. He succeeded in capturing the Dehlek Islands. In July 1555 he was appointed as governor of the newly established Abyssinian province. He also seized Zeila, which was captured from the Portuguese. He continued his campaigns, capturing the port of Arkiko and in 1558 conquered virtually the entire Tigray province. He built a customs house and fortifications in Massawa, he left the port under the command of an Agha of a Janissary troop. In 1559 he defeated Bahr Negash Yeshaq and conquered Debarwa.

He died in 1560 and was buried in a tomb in a mosque in Massawa. His son, Özdemiroğlu Osman Pasha succeeded him, and became the Grand Vizier of the Ottoman Empire from 1584 to 1585.

== Campaign in Upper Egypt ==
In order to re-establish Ottoman authority in Upper Egypt, an expedition led by Özdemir Pasha in the mid 16th century seized Ibrim, Aswan and Say from the Funj Sultanate and garrisoned them with Bosnian troops. A new province, Berberistan, was thereby established.
