= Damot (historical region) =

Area in western Ethiopia

Damot (Amharic: ዳሞት Dāmot) was a historical region located in western Ethiopia. The region was situated south of Gojjam and covered most of Ethiopia's Welega Province. Until the fourteenth century it was ruled by its own independent kingdom, before its conquest by the Ethiopian Emperor Amda Seyon I, after which it would serve as an important province within the Ethiopian Empire during the medieval period.

== History ==
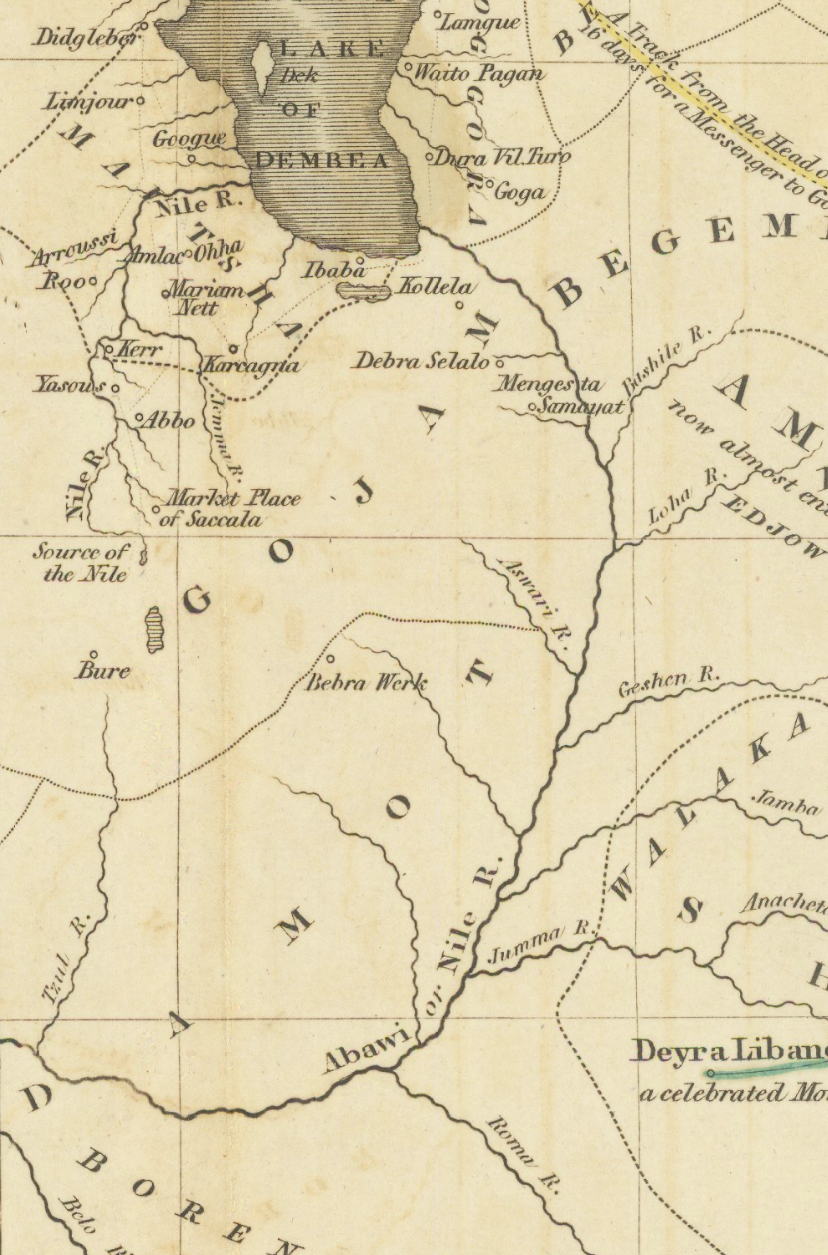
19th century map of Damot province located south of Gojjam

Damot was the name given to a territory situated south of the Blue Nile and west of Shewa. The area was originally inhabited by a pagan north Omotic-speaking ethnic group related to those of Ennarea and Kafa. The earliest reference to the area was in the medieval Egyptian History of the Patriarchs of Alexandria which states that the country of Bani al-Hamwiyah was led by the warrior queen Gudit and rebelled against the Christians of Ethiopia. Carlo Conti Rossini first proposed that the account of this warrior queen where she was described as Bani al-Hamwiyah, ought to be read as Bani al-Damutah, and argued that she was ruler of the once-powerful Kingdom of Damot.

The polity seems to have developed contacts with the northern Zagwe dynasty in early medieval times as according to a 15th-century religious text, a Zagwe ruler sent out an expedition to Damot. Around the same time the Ethiopian Orthodox Church began to attempt to proselytize the region, sending missionaries such as Tekle Haymanot who according to traditions, converted the ruler of Damot to Christianity. The region was then incorporated into Ethiopia after its conquest by Amda Seyon I in 1316–17. Damot is later mentioned in the chronicles of Amda Seyon as several of his units in his army were called up from the province of Damot. Damot warriors participated in Amda Seyon's crusades against the Muslims of Ifat and Adal in the east.

Damot played an important role in the Horn of Africa trade, as the territory was reportedly an important source of gold. Ibn Sa'id al-Maghribi asserts that gold and rare metals from this province were exported as far as Zeila. Portuguese explorer Francisco Álvares who visited the province in the early 16th century describes it being "very big" and that the area produced "plenty supply of provisions" such as ginger, grapes and peaches as well as "many fat sheep and cows of great sizes". The province was likewise renowned for its slaves who were much esteemed "by the Arabs" according to Alvares, who would "not let them go at any price". Arabia, Persia, India, Egypt and Greece were full of slaves from Damot who, upon converting to Islam, made "very good Moors and great warriors".

In the medieval period gold and slaves were acquired by Muslim traders to the Kingdom of Damot and the Hadiya Sultanate, who were known for slave raiding, to the Christian Amhara who (during that time) opposed castration. According to "The Glorious Victories," the soldiers of Amda Seyon were from "Amhara and Sewä and Gojjam and Dämot, (men) who were trained in warfare, and dressed in gold and silver and fine clothes archers, spearmen, cavalry, and infantry with strong legs, trained for war. When they go to war they fight like eagles and run like wild goats; the (movement) of their feet is like the rolling of stones, and their sound is like the roaring of the sea, as says the prophet Herege'el: "I have heard the sound of the wings of the angels, as the noise of a camp." Such were the soldiers of 'Amda Seyon, full of confidence in war."

In 1531, Damot was conquered by Imam Ahmad ibn Ibrahim of Adal who then appointed Gasa Umar as its governor. Damot warriors participated in the early battles against Adal but one of the Adalite generals sneeringly dismissed the participation of Damot soldiers, declaring them to be no more than slaves capable of tilting the land, cutting the trees and carrying wood, but were entirely ignorant of warfare. Following the death of Imam in 1543, Emperor Gelawdewos would eventually restore imperial rule over the province. Emperor Sarsa Dengel also visited the province on numerous occasions and many Damot warriors served in his armies and were engaged, for example against the Oromos in Waj in 1572.

Damot was profoundly affected by the Oromo migrations. The Oromos reached the area, according to Bahrey under the lubaship of Birmaje (1578–1586). Bahrey states that the Boran clan surrounded the province "enslaved the men and carried off the livestock". The Oromo advance was also mentioned in the chronicles of Sarsa Dengel, which reports that the region of Damot was under the occupation of the Macha Oromos. According to Manuel de Almeida, many people from Damot fled the province and settled north of the Blue Nile. A consequence of this move was that the term Damot was extended to include the area of southern Gojjam. Although it is unknown when exactly the move and the change of name occurred.

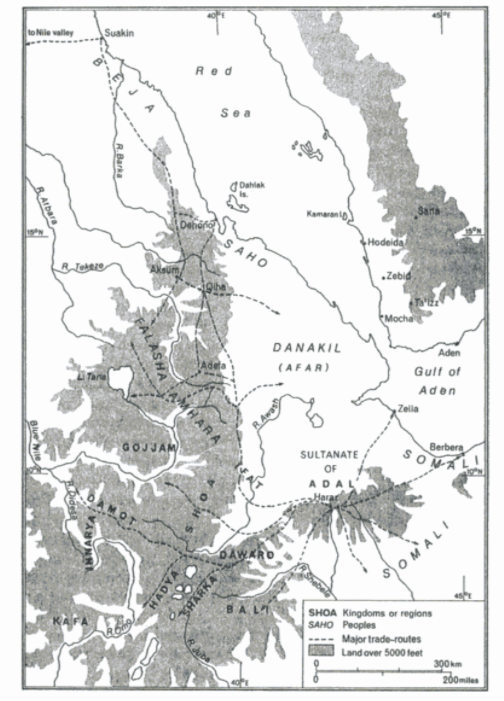
Medieval map of peoples, kingdoms and regions alongside major trade routes in the Horn

== See also ==
- History of Ethiopia
- Kingdom of Damot
- Welega Province
