= Oromo expansion =

16–17th century northerly expansions of Oromo people

Oromo expansions
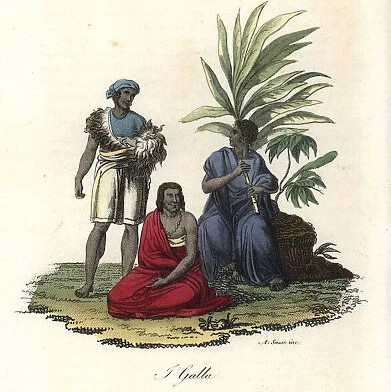
- The Borana on the left (expanded westward), the Barento on the right (expanded eastward), and the Luba in the middle (elders, rulers, or sorcerers).
- Time: 16th and 17th centuries (greatest estimate)
- Place: Horn of Africa
- Event: Oromo conquests of various kingdoms, empires, and principalities

The Oromo expansions or the Oromo invasions (in older historiography, Galla invasions), were a series of expansions and conquests in the 16th and 17th centuries by the Oromo primarily documented by the Gamo monk Bahrey, but also mentioned in other Christian, Muslim and Portuguese records. Prior to their great expansion in the 16th century, the Oromo inhabited only the area of what is now modern-day southern Ethiopia and northern Kenya. Over the centuries, many factors – mostly the wars between the Adal Sultanate and the Ethiopian Empire – would further encourage the numerous Oromo pastoralist tribes to expand towards what is now central and eastern Ethiopia. The military campaigns of Imam Ahmad ibn Ibrahim al-Ghazi and the Adal Sultanate against the Christian kingdom created a political and military vacuum that allowed the Oromo to move relatively unhindered into the territories of both the Christian kingdom and the Muslim sultanates.

== History ==
A medieval European, the Portuguese missionary Manuel de Almeida, upon learning of the invasion, noted that both Adal and Abyssinia were experiencing divine retribution:

Thence first came this plague and scourge of God in the days of the Emperor David, who was at first called by his baptismal name, Lebena Danguil, and was also called Onag Cagued afterwards. They emerged at the same time as the Moor Granh of Adel had invaded and already conquered a large part of the empire. They invaded the Kingdom of Baly, with which they had a common frontier, or of which they were close neighbours. They also invaded the Kingdom of Adel which we call Zeila, bordering on Baly, for the Gallas were the scourge, not only of the Abyssinians, but also of the Moors of Adel. This was either so that they should not be proud about their victories over the Abyssinians, or else so that the Abyssinians should understand that, through Granh and the Moors of Adel, God was punishing them as a loving father, to make them ask for help from the King of Portugal, promise to obey the Roman Pontiff, accept the true faith and abominate the heresies of Eutches and Dioscurus.

=== Legend of Liqimssa ===
The legend of Liqimssa is an ancient legend stemming from the Borana sect of the Oromo peoples that is credited as having been one of the main motivations for the beginning of the Oromo expansions. The Liqimssa roughly translates to "The Swallower" and was told to be a beast that consumed people one by one until there was nobody left to fight against it. It is meant to embody "hunger", and the story represents how a powerful entity will consume all there is around it until the "land of plenty" (in reference to the Borana homeland) is left barren and empty.

=== Early expansions ===
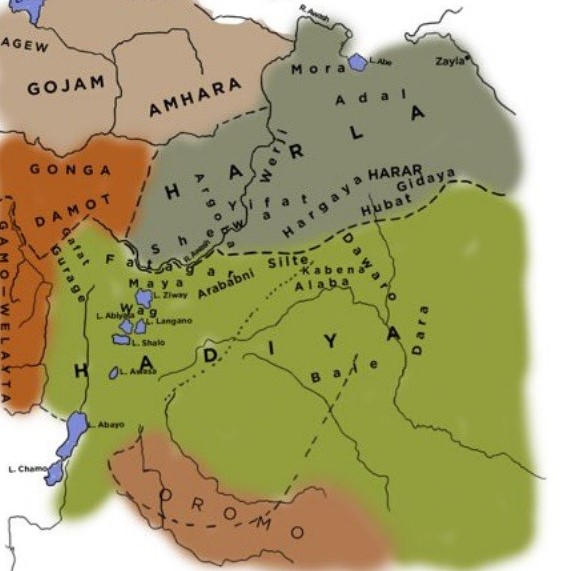
Oromo territory on the eve of the Oromo invasions, located south of present-day Ethiopia

The early expansions were characterized by sporadic raids by Oromo pastoralists on the frontiers of the Ethiopian kingdom. After capturing cattle and other booty, the raiding parties would quickly return to their homelands. Actual settlement of new territories would not begin until the Gadaa of Meslé. Gudifecha adoption tradition also lead to massive diversification within Oromo populations as they expanded during the 16th century.

==== Mélbah (1522–1530) and Mudena (1530–1538) ====
According to Bahrey, the earliest Oromo expansion occurred under the Oromo luba Melbah, during the time of Emperor Dawit II. He states that they invaded the neighbouring Bale, in the southeast, just before the invasions of Ahmad ibn Ibrahim al-Ghazi of Adal in the north. These early incursions (Oromo: razzia) were limited, however, as the encroaching groups returned to their homeland near the Shebelle River after each raid. Raids continued under Mudena past the Wabi Shebelle, but these groups also returned home shortly. The reason for the Oromo returning after their short conquests is that the Christian and Muslim kingdoms that surrounded Oromo pastoralists were deeply embroiled in wars. Instead of engaging with either kingdom directly, they targeted isolated communities that would go unnoticed and allowed their enemies to destroy each other without Oromo intervention.

===== Three stages of Oromo movements =====
By the 1530s, the Oromo pastoralists had developed a three-staged method for territorial expansion; "scouting, night time surprise attack and settlement" (159). The introduction of scouting teams shows that the Oromo pastoralists had quickly become accustomed to border warfare. The night time attacks that would come to follow were unceasing and relentless, stripping the community of their "booty" and killing a large amount of the warrior class, then escaping before dawn as to avoid being followed back to their base camps. Once the community under siege was broken down enough to be settled without resistance, the remaining peoples would quickly be integrated through Moggaasaa, having their status, material goods and general livelihoods returned to them. The remaining warriors would join the Oromo gada's troops. With each period of adoption into the fighting class, the Oromo's knowledge of the local terrain would increase drastically.

Gada itself provided a structure that encouraged expansion continuously. The Luba had different classes each of which were required on coming to power to raid and settle lands never before settled by any previous generation of the Luba. Any person who killed an enemy or dangerous animal used to have his head shaved into a style called Sab'a guteya and greased with butter, but anybody who had not killed used to have his head left unshaven and filled with lice, known as Dula Gutu. As per the Ethiopian chronicler from the nineteenth century Asma Giyorgis, the same status system developed on the Christian side of the frontier as well, where a soldier could not grease his head until he killed an Oromo. Later, the Oromo scholar Asmarom Legesse found a connection between such a system and a similar institution named Butta, under which a graduating class was sent into enemy territory specifically to bring back the spoils of war.

==== Kilolé (1538–1546) ====
After the death of Ahmed Gragn, Kilolé resumed his predecessor's raids and pierced further into Ethiopian territory. Aided by the weakening of both the Ethiopian Empire and the Adal Sultanate, he raided as far as the province of Dawaro, north of Bali. Again, however, after each raid, the parties returned to their villages. Bahrey's dating might, however, be off, as Shihab ad-din, who had written a decade before Ahmed Gragn's death, noted a locality named Werre Qallu, an Oromo name, in the province of Dawaro. Francisco de Almeida, however, agreed with Bahrey's dating, by affirming that the Oromo first began migrating around the time of Ahmed Gragn's invasion (1527).

=== Bifolé (1546–1554) ===
During the time of luba Bifolé, the Oromo migration achieved its first major success. All previous movements had been minor raids on neighbouring provinces, but under Bifolé, new raids were undertaken that began to weaken Ethiopian control. All of Dewaro was pillaged, and Fatagar to its north was attacked for the first time. Furthermore, according to Bahrey, the inhabitants of the pillaged areas were enslaved to become gebrs (Ge'ez: ገብር gabr; Amh. ግብር gebr, Tgn. ግብሪ gebri), a term referring more precisely to "tax-paying serfs", similar to the serfs in Ethiopia during feudal times. Emperor Gelawdewos, however, campaigned in the south as a result of those attacks. According to his chronicle, the Emperor defeated the Oromo incursions and made subject to his rule those he captured, which prevented further attacks for some time, with further incursions reduced to skirmishes. The initial attacks were significant, however, on a much larger and more devastating scale to the Ethiopian dynasty. Despite his reprisals, Gelawdewos was troubled and was forced to settle refugees in a town of Wej, north of Lake Zway, around 1550–1551.

=== Settlement ===
==== Meslé (1554–1562) ====
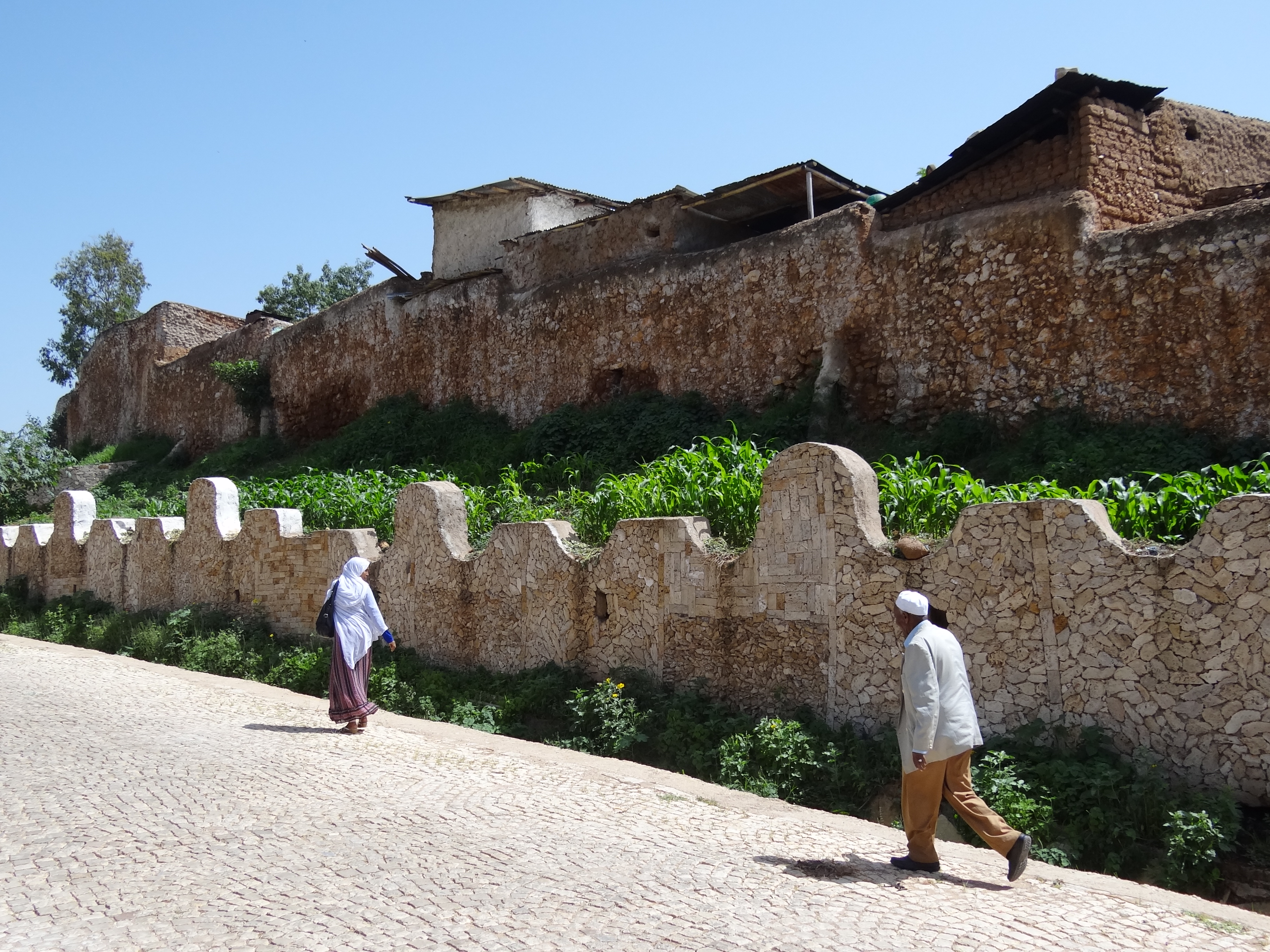
Harar city fortifications originally erected in the sixteenth century following the Oromo invasions

Meslé's time represent a fundamental change in the expansion of the Oromo. Newly-taken territories were permanently settled by Oromo for the first time. In the new phase of migration adopted under Meslé, the Oromo defeated Emperor Gelawdewos's Jan Amora corps, allowing them to pillage a number of towns. Instead of returning to their homelands, however, they stayed in the new territories. Gelawdewos campaigned against the Oromo as a result, defeating them at 'Asa Zeneb (yet unidentified), but he was nevertheless unable to drive them from the frontier provinces and continued to build the new town in Wej for new refugees.

Oromo expansions were not restricted to Ethiopian territories either, as activities against Adal were also pursued. Gelawdewos was killed in the year 1559 at Naṣ Sar, on the border of Wollo during a conflict with the Adalites. On the return journey from this military expedition, Adal general Nur was ambushed near Azalo by the Oromo of the Luba Mencelle (also written as Mikale); according to Bahrey, there had been "no such slaughter since the Oromo first invaded," and Nur's army was almost totally destroyed.

When Nur arrived in Harar, he found the land desolate and the sultan dead as a result of the Sack of Harar. Bahrey records what happened next:

The Gällä followed him [Nur] and entered the country. The Akkečču Gällä spread as far as Barbara. Menčelle began to use horses, a thing that his predecessors had never done, for he had observed Amir Nur and realized that an enemy could escape on horseback. He said, "I made those who used to walk on two or three feet go on four".

Nur's death took place, according to the usual date, in 1567/8, though some sources place it as late as 1575, following another military operation against the Oromo of Bale.

==== Harmufa (1562–1570) and Robalé (1570–1578) ====
During the luba of Harmufa rule, the Oromo advanced even deeper into Ethiopian territory. With the use of horses, they were able to attack the province Amhara, and Angot. Further advances were made under Robalé during whose time Shewa was pillaged and Gojjam attacked. For the first time, Oromo advances were devastating core Ethiopian provinces, but their earlier incursions had been simply against frontier provinces. Despite the deeper attacks, the core provinces remained under Ethiopian control, and Emperor Sarsa Dengel carried out punitive expeditions in return. One such reprisal in 1573 involved the engagement of the Oromo near Lake Zway in a frontier province. He defeated them, took their cattle and distributed the herd among his subjects, who were described in his chronicle as "becoming rich" as a result.

Among the territories permanently lost during this period was Fatagar, a former Christian imperial province on the northern shore of the Awaš river where Ethiopian emperors had maintained royal residences. The Encyclopaedia Aethiopica records that the region was occupied by the Oromo during this period, and that the name Fatagar gradually fell out of use entirely.

==== Michelle Gadaa invasion of Adal period (1562–1579) ====
At the same time, Barento Oromo groups attacked the Adal Sultanate, which was greatly weakened by its wars with the Christian Ethiopians leading to no potential resistance. In the 16th century, the Oromo began their invasion of Harar region occupying as far as Hobat which forced the Adal Sultanate to erect a wall around Harar the capital city of the principality. By the late sixteenth century other Adalite towns in the Harar region also began to construct ramparts such as Gidaya, and Dakkar. According to Harari chronicles the combination of the Oromo invasion which followed drought led to the destruction of several towns and regions including Sim, Shewa, Negeb, Hargaya and Dakkar. Oromo invasions in the Harar region were followed by epidemic and food shortages in Adal's capital Harar leading to massive loss of life which included Adal leader Nur ibn Mujahid among the casualties in 1567.

The Oromo attacks on the Harar plateau did not let up in 1572, as recounted in a Harari chronicle.

While Amir Muhammad was away on campaign the Oromos devastated the region. They are said to have destroyed a hundred Muslim villages, and advancing to the city's very walls, besieged Harar. Fierce fightings took place at one of the gates, which was soon full of corpses. Wazir Hamid was reportedly struck by twenty spears, but, though seriously wounded, succeeded in returning to the city alive. The invaders were later repulsed.

The Adal Sultanate would move its capital to Aussa due to the Oromo provocation in 1577 however Adal leader imam Muhammad Gasa would be killed in battle against the Oromo in 1583. In the Chercher region of Harar, Ittu Oromo would incorporate the Harari and plausibly the Harla people. Its presumed the last remaining pre Oromo invasion inhabitants the Harla people were able to survive due to the fortification of the city of Harar. Scholar Christopher Ehret stated the greater part of the Adal Muslim population were assimilated by the Oromos with the exception of pockets of Harari and Argobba semitic speakers. According to historian Mohammed Hassen and others, the Oromo invasions were devastating for the Harari people and is one of the major reasons for their diminished populace.

The Hawiye and Dir clans became the predominant inhabitants of Hararghe Highlands (land of the Hararis) in the 16th century after the weakening of Adal. The Oromos took advantage of the crippling state and decided to also invade and to occupy the Hararghe Highlands and assimilate with Somali clan population of Jarso, Akisho, Gurgura, Nole, Metta, Oborra, and Bursuk. All were sub-clans of Dir, a major Somali clan, and were later confederated into the Afran Qallo clan.

According to I. M. Lewis, in the early 1600s Ughaz Ali Makahil successfully repelled the Oromo Invasions in modern northern Somalia.

=== Displacement of prior populations ===
Among the peoples most directly displaced by the Oromo expansion were the Gafat people, a distinct Semitic-speaking group who inhabited a long stretch of territory on the left bank of the Abbay river, extending from the Wäläqa river in northern Shewa well into eastern Wälläga, with their southern boundary reaching as far as the headwaters of the Awaš — the region of what is now Addis Ababa. From the late 16th century onwards the Gafat were increasingly exposed to the pressure of the northwards-migrating Oromo. Unable to resist decisively, large numbers of Gafat left their ancestral homelands and migrated across the Abbay into Gojjam, where they were gradually absorbed into Amhara society. Those who remained in their original territories were assimilated into Oromo society. Their linguistic and cultural Amharization was virtually complete by the mid-20th century, by which time they had ceased to exist as a distinct people.

Similarly, the process of dispossession took place in reverse on another occasion. In the district of Manz, which had come under the control of the Karrayyu Oromo after their expansions, the Shewan Amhara chief Nagasi, acting under the authority of Iyasu I, the emperor of Ethiopia in the late seventeenth century, expelled the Karrayu from lands lying waste since the time of Ahmad Gragn and which they had been using as grazing lands; he then had these lands cultivated and distributed as church and settler grants known as Gassa, laying the territorial foundation of the later Shewan kingdom.

=== Reprisals under Sarsa Dengel ===
The Oromo also encountered conflict with the Argobba following their invasion of Ifat and Shewa. Forced to fight the Ottomans in the north of his empire, Sarsa Dengel turned to curb the spread of the Oromo in the south in the 1570s. The first mention of his actions is in his short Royal Chronicle, which states that he fought a force of Borana Oromo at Lake Zway under a luba named Ambissa. After the 1572 rains, the Oromo had taken Wej, and the Emperor gathered his forces from throughout Ethiopia to form an army at Gind Beret. From there, Sarsa Dengel headed south, where he found that the Oromo had also taken Maya. Despite the small size of his army, he was able to defeat the Oromo in the area, push them back to Fatagar, and capture a large number of cattle. Sarsa Dengel again learned in 1574 of Oromo incursions in Shewa and of the pillaging of cattle in lowland Zéma. The Emperor sent Azzaj Halibo with only 50 cavalry to the area, who forced the Oromo to flee and sent the heads of 80 Oromos to the Emperor as trophies. Sarsa Dengel was again forced to head north with his army to crush the Ottoman-backed Bahr Negus Yeshaq, but later returned to Wej in 1577–1578 to fend off Oromo advances in the area. As a result of the battle in the Mojjo Valley (just east of modern Addis Ababa) against the Borana Oromo, corpses were strewn all over the surrounding countryside. The Emperor then fended off an attack by the Abati Oromo near Bashilo River. As a result of the battle, according to Bahrey, less than ten Oromo survived.

==== Birmajé Gadaa (1578–1586) ====
Despite Sarsa Dengel's military campaigns, the Oromo expansion continued to spread west during this time. It was under luba Birmajé that the Oromo first began to use body-length ox-hide shields. The shields allowed the Oromo to resist arrows and therefore to defeat the Mayas. The Oromo often came into conflict with Daharagot, one of Sarsa Dengel's commanders, who was often successful. Nevertheless, during this time, the Oromo pillaged Ar'ine in Wej, killing Ethiopian couriers in the process. Further advances were then made in Damot, which was situated south of the Blue Nile, according to Bahrey the Boran clan surrounded the province "enslaved the men and carried off the livestock". According to Manuel de Almeida, many people from Damot then fled the province and settled north of the Blue Nile in Gojjam. A consequence of this move was that the term Damot was extended to include the area of southern Gojjam. Although it is unknown when exactly the move and the change of name occurred.

While the Borana under Birmaje was raiding Shewa and Damot, the Barentu trekked north. Of the other Barentu groups, the Warantisha had already started spreading out along the valley of the Walaqa rivers, in southern Bete Amhara and in Gedem and the Karrayu spread throughout Amhara and Angot. Of the numerous Karrayu groups, the "seven houses" of Wollo had started to establish themselves in the southeastern section of the Bete Amhara province, the Wollo Oromo settled there and gave their name to the province. A section of the Wollo Oromo raided the Muslim region of Aussa where they defeated and killed Muhammad Gasa, a descendant of Ahmad Gragn.

==== Mul'eta Gadaa (1586–1594) ====
Under luba Mul'eta a large raid (Oromo: dulaguto) was made on Gojjam north of the Blue Nile. With the Ottoman situation in the north largely under control, Sarsa Dengel again took the initiative against the Oromo in the south, where he forced the Dawé (or Jawé) Oromo in Wej to flight. Despite this, the Oromos under Mul'eta would win spectacular victories and waged war in all directions. According to Bahrey, the Ethiopians suffered repeated defeats and lost all of their southern provinces during the period of the Mul'eta gada.

Mulata of the Borana afflicted the Christians of Damot, scattered them, and devastated their country; from his time Shewa and Damot were deserted ... The country submits to him, Mulata, and none remains without submission to him. When this book was written it was the seventh year [i.e. 1593] of the government of Mulata.

— Abba Bahrey

Sarsa Dengel's response included both military retaliation and settlement policies. In the twenty-fifth year of his reign, somewhere around 1588, he marched towards Qwara and destroyed most of the Werentesa, an Oromo tribe that does not seem to have survived as such in subsequent years. However, not all the Oromo groups that had made it up to the northern frontier suffered the same fate; those that had advanced into Amhara territory were slowly absorbed into the Christian population of Gojjam and Begemeder, and some other groups withdrew towards Shewa. On the other hand, in the territories that he had subjugated in Gojjam and Dembiya, Sarsa Dengel is alleged to have given uncultivated and abandoned lands to Oromo settlers and facilitated their mixing up with the Christian populace, a policy his successors Susenyos and Iyasu I later continued on a larger scale.

=== 17th century ===
==== Ethiopian Empire ====
During the first half of the 17th century, invasions by different pastoralist Oromo groups were a permanent menace to the Ethiopian Empire. About 1617, the Oromos attacked Begemder and Gojjam, which were central regions of the empire. Between 1620 and 1660, the Ethiopian emperors had to defend different parts of their territory but could not stop to the waves of advancing Oromo groups. The Tulama expanded from Shewa into Amhara and the Wallo and Azebo overran Angot, parts of Amhara and Waj, Begemder, and Tigre. In 1642 the eastern Oromo nearly annihilated the Ethiopian army from Tigray. Under the reign of emperors Fasiladas and Yohannes II, the Oromo seem to have been virtually unrestrained in their expansion. During his visit to Abyssinia in the 1600s, the Yemeni ambassador Al-Haymī remarked that the Oromo were similar to the Mongols.

A significant shift in Ethiopian–Oromo relations came under Emperor Susényos (r. 1606–1632), who had grown up among the Oromo, spoke their language and knew their way of life. He employed Oromo fighters, military tactics and combat formations against his rivals for the throne, and once in power filled high-level offices with Oromo supporters. He settled various Oromo groups in both Gojjam and Begemder to defend his empire from attacks by other Oromo groups, and many of these converts to Orthodox Christianity became permanently assimilated into highland Ethiopian society. The Begemder settlement in particular was formed as a consequence of civil warfare, not just defensive strategy. In his campaign for the throne against the rival faction headed by Ras Za Sellase, Susenyos instructed his own troops, together with an Oromo military force, to destroy the region of Begemder three times because its regiments had refused to submit to him, putting their children to death, capturing women and cattle, and burning down their dwellings; after that destruction, he stationed his Oromo troops on the emptied land.

Independent Oromo raiding compounded this devastation. During the same period, Abetohun Walda Krestos complained to Susenyos that the Marawa, which was a confederation of Oromo groups, had killed his relations and laid waste to his own country of Wagerat. This prompted Susenyos to send Oromo elders to negotiate with them and keep them from advancing into Tegre. The Marawa also penetrated the monastery of Hayq, the seat of Abba Iyasus Mo'a, and caused great trouble there before Susenyos expelled them. Susenyos himself later led a further campaign into Begemder with a large Oromo army, then crossed into Gojjam and ravaged it even more severely than Begemder.

Susenyos's own authority was not immune to Oromo attack. In the fifth year of his reign, while marching to suppress a rebellion in Tegre led by a man falsely claiming to be the late emperor Ya'eqob, he turned back to intercept a confederation of three Oromo groups collectively called the Marawa that had entered Begemder; in the ensuing battle his army was routed and he himself was defeated. The victorious Marawa then devastated the province of Enfraz, laying waste to it as far as Goraba and Cekra, and burned down Qoga, Susenyos's own royal town, before withdrawing to continue raiding elsewhere.

The rule of Susenyos was also responsible for some of the most severe punishments of this era. The history written by Asma Giyorgis mentions one such event when the forces of Susenyos attacked Oromo raiders and caused severe damage to them; the army of Susenyos would carry the heads of the enemies as trophies, and would also hunt down survivors during their escape in order to make sure that none of them returned to their people. After one such campaign came to an end, it is mentioned that the Oromos captured by him were made to undergo castration and had their ears and noses cut off before being sent back to their people. Episodes such as these indicate that the violence of the period ran in both directions rather than being confined to Oromo raiding.

Iyasu I the Great (1682–1706) resumed the offensive against the Oromo and recruited battalions of Oromo which pledged their allegiance, whom he settled in conquered areas. Tulama and Liban Oromo were settled in northern Gojjam and Begemder and were encouraged to convert to Christianity. Some of their authorities were appointed to high offices in the army and in the administration of the provinces. In 1684–1685, Oromo groups fought against Emperor Iyasu I in Wollo and Gojjam. In 1694, the Gugru-Oromo attacked Gojjam and Begemder.

During the reign of Emperor Tewoflos (1708–1711), the revolt of Gojjam, under the leadership of Tege, a man who organized a large number of Oromos belonging to the Liban, Baso and Qalaganda factions, was put down at Yebaba; the burning of more than five hundred Oromos who entered in the church of Dabra Mawi'e located in its proximity was ordered by Tewoflos, and as noted in the chronicle, none of them escaped alive to tell the story. In the course of the same period, Wallo Oromos invaded the Amba of Atronsa Maryam in Saynt, a prominent royal monastery, scattering its historic relics, killing its clergy and carrying away women and children as prisoners; they even tossed the disputed picture of the Virgin and Child and the bones of the fifteenth-century emperor Ba'eda Maryam, who was buried in the Amba, over the steep cliff, in 1709.

Although the military expansion of the Oromo continued, many Oromo groups started to settle in Ethiopian territory and developed into a political power, which was used by the different secular and ecclesiastical groupings. Emperor Iyasu II married an Oromo woman from the Yejju dynasty in Wällo and was succeeded by his half-Oromo son, Iyoas I. By the late 18th century, the Oromo had become such a dominant political force in Gondar that Oromifaa was the main language spoken at the imperial court. This growing influence provoked a backlash: in 1769 Mikael Sehul of Tigray, determined to restore Ethiopian Christian control, removed the influence of the Yejju Oromo from the imperial court, killed the reigning monarch, and inaugurated the era of political turmoil known as the Zemene Mesafint.

==== Ajuran Empire ====
In the mid-17th century, the Oromos began expanding from their homeland around Lake Abaya in southern Ethiopia towards the southern Somali coast while the Ajuran Empire was at the height of its power. The Garen rulers conducted several military expeditions, known as the Gaal Madow wars, against the Oromo warriors. The Ajuran with their guns forced the Oromo conquerors to reverse their migrations towards the war-ravaged Muslim Adalites.

=== 18th century ===
Around 1710, the Macha Oromo reached to the Gonga kingdom of Ennarea in the Gibe region that had a king by name of Shisafotchi. He tried to come to terms with the situation by absorbing into his administration the energy of ambitious Macha individuals. That proved to be the cause of his destruction. By favouring the Oromo at his courts, Shisafotchi alienated his own people. The ambitious Oromo individuals at his court harnessed the popular fury to their own advantage by overthrowing the king and taking over the kingdom.

Also around the 18th century, the Macha Oromo crossed the Gojeb river and led an invasion of the Kingdom of Kaffa. They found formidable natural barriers, which opposed their advance towards Kaffa. The mountainous jungle terrain made rapid cavalry attack and retreat virtually impossible, and their advance was halted by the Kafficho. They, however, conquered all territories north of the Gojeb, including the city of Jimma.

=== Integration and assimilation ===
In addition to expansion through conquest and displacement, the Oromos created long-term methods of incorporating others into their ranks. An individual from outside the Oromos could be integrated into a clan through a ritual called Moggaasa, which involved an Abba Dula, animal sacrifice, and the swearing of an oath; once the ceremony was completed, the outsider could move freely around Oromo society, and the murder of a person adopted into a family resulted in the need to make a substantial compensation to that family. If the adoption took place between people from the same clan, it happened according to a different ceremony called Kollu.

By the beginning of the eighteenth century, such processes had become mixed with intermarriage between Oromo people and members of the Gondar aristocracy: Asma Giyorgis mentions that Yosedeq, an Oromo from Gojjam, married Walatta Esra'el, a daughter of Empress Mentewab. Charles Beke, describing the region of Shewa in the early 1840s, noted that Oromo who settled there were obliged to adopt Christianity, at least nominally, had their own rulers appointed, took up cultivation, and within a short time became largely indistinguishable from the Amhara.

== Impact ==
The Oromo migrations have had a major impact on the modern day Horn of Africa. Within sixty years of their settlement in the Gibe region, five Oromo states had emerged: Limmu-Ennarea, Gomma, Gumma, Jimma, and Gera, with two more in the Wollega region. These states arose through the transformation of the Oromo mode of production from pastoralism to mixed agriculture and the growth of a merchant class driven by trade.

In other instances, the change was just as much about ecological disaster as about settling into agriculture, according to Asma Giyorgis's chronicle; there is mention of a very harsh drought and heat wave, occurring amid unrest in Ennarya, when Oromo herds were largely destroyed because the diet of the Oromo people was based on milk rather than grain, whereas their agricultural neighbours survived on their crops. The survivors of the famine are said to have then taken up farming themselves.

Oral traditions collected by Asma Giyorgis relate to the origins of several Gibe kingdoms. The royal family of Limmu-Ennarea derived from a man called Bofu Bokku, whose son Abba Bagibo ruled for 42 years and is considered to have been one of the strongest Gibe kings. Guma had been established by a Muslim merchant, Adam; one of his descendants, Abba Ballo, was notorious for his odd, cruel attitude towards his courtiers and for his murder of Tullu Gunji, the king of neighbouring Gera, whom he had lured to a private meeting and then killed. It was Tullu Gunji, according to oral tradition, who had created the kingdom of Gera by clearing forest and opening new springs to found a settlement, which was then inherited by his descendants. Goma was believed to have been established by a Muslim immigrant named Awalina from Gojjam, and Gemma, or Jimma, by Abba Magal the Great, who hailed from Sayyo.

By the 1880s, all five of these kingdoms, together with the chiefdoms of Meca situated further west, paid tribute to Ras Gobana, the Shewan general, as he crossed the Gibe river, an event that Oromo and Amhara oral tradition alike linked to an older prophecy predicting that Oromo domination would last eight generations before an Amhara reconquest.

Farther north, in Christian Ethiopia, individuals of Oromo background (i.e. the Yejju) gained significant political sway. Some seized power in the city of Gondar during the Zemene Mesafint "Era of Princes", a period similar to China's Warring States Period.

The contemporary historian Bahrey offered a sociological explanation for the success of the Oromo expansion, arguing that it was because all Oromo men were trained as warriors, while among Ethiopian Christians only the warriors fought, leaving a large section of the population — including monks, priests, artisans, farmers, traders, and servants — uninvolved in the defense of their country.

== See also ==
- History of Ethiopia
- Oromo people
- Human migration
- List of Oromo subgroups and clans
