= Bahrey =

Ethiopian monk, author, historian, and ethnographer in the 16th century

Abba Bahrey (Ge'ez: ባሕርይ bāḥriy, "pearl") was a late 16th-century Ethiopian monk, historian, and ethnographer, from the southern region of Gamo. He is best known for his 1593 work on the history of the Oromo and their migrations in the 16th century, the "History of the Galla" ("ዜናሁ ፡ ለጋላ" zēnāhū lagāllā), "Galla" being a historical and now pejorative term for the Oromo. This short work is considered the ultimate source for information on the sixteenth century history of the Oromo that Manuel de Almeida borrowed heavily from in writing his history of Ethiopia, and Hiob Ludolf derived much of his information on the Oromo from Baltazar Téllez's abridgment of Almeida's work. Bahrey was also the author of Emperor Sarsa Dengel's chronicle, "The History of King Sarsa Dengel."

== Life ==
Bahrey was born and lived in the southernly region of Gamo near the shores of Lake Abaya until he was victimized by an earlier Oromo raid, as he later wrote that they "devastated his country" and "looted all that he possessed". (Note: Bahrey addresses himself in third person) He then fled to the northwestern part of the empire and entered into the service of Emperor Sarsa Dengel. Carlo Conti Rossini published an extract from a short manuscript where Bahrey is explicitly mentioned as being the author of Emperor Sarsa Dengel's chronicle. From this, most contemporary historians regard Abba Bahrey as being the author of "The History of King Sarsa Dengel."

Bahrey was most well known for his work Zenahu la Galla, or "History of the Galla". In this work, Bahrey records the history of the Oromo migrations in great detail, he also documents on other aspects of Oromo society, such as the Gadaa system, their tribal divisions and their egalitarian social structure. The manuscript primarily acted as a sort of position paper on how to halt the Oromo invasions. Bahrey was deeply saddened by the Christian inability to halt the Oromo invasions, he writes that even though the population of the Christians were vast and they were better armed, their actual fighting force was very small compared to that of the Oromos and "because of the fewness of these, our country is destroyed." In the end he called for the total mobilization of all Christians for the purpose of stopping the Oromo advances. In his work, Bahrey consistently described the Oromos as being bloodthirsty and violent, claiming they had only come to "destroy and kill us", as a result of his obvious prejudice, Mohammed Hassen claims that this "depreciates the value of his great work in the eyes of Oromo nationalists."

Bahrey was later mentioned in the chronicle of Susenyos I where he was present among the nobles, administrators and advisors at the unofficial coronation of Susenyos in 1604. This suggests that he might have become an important official at the royal court.

== See also ==
- Ethiopian historiography
- History of Ethiopia
- Sarsa Dengel
