= Modernization under Haile Selassie =

Overview at modernization of Ethiopia during Haile Selassie regime

Many changes were made during the reign of Haile Selassie toward the modernization of Ethiopia upon his accession as Emperor (King of Kings) on 2 November 1930, as well as before, beginning from the time he effectively controlled Ethiopia in 1916 as Regent Plenipotentiary, Ras Tafari.

== First modernization ==
Many of the details of the modernizations made before the fascist invasion during the Second Italo–Ethiopian War are written in Haile Selassie I's autobiography, My Life and Ethiopia's Progress Vol. I (written 1938), particularly in Chapter 12, "About the improvement, by ordinance and proclamation, of internal administration, and about the efforts to allow foreign civilization to enter Ethiopia".

Modernization was temporarily interrupted in 1935 following the invasion of Ethiopia by fascist Italy, eventually culminating in the Second World War. As the Emperor himself noted in his Introduction to Volume I, "We were particularly convinced, by the policies directed against Us, that the enemy's heart was stricken with envy at Our setting up a constitution to strengthen and to consolidate Ethiopia's unity, at Our opening schools for boys and girls, at Our building hospitals in which Our people's health was to be safeguarded, as well as at all sorts of other initiatives of Ours by which Ethiopia's independence would be affirmed, not only in terms of history but in actual fact."

=== Abolition of slavery ===
Slavery as practiced in what is modern Ethiopia and Eritrea was essentially domestic. Slaves thus served in the houses of their masters or mistresses and were not employed to any significant extent for productive purpose. Among the Amhara and Tigray slaves were normally regarded as second-class members of their owners' family. and were fed, clothed and protected. They generally roamed around freely and conducted business as free people. They had complete freedom of religion and culture. The first attempt to abolish slavery in Ethiopia was made by Emperor Tewodros II (r. 1855–1868), but the slave trade was not abolished completely until 1923 with Ethiopia's accession to the League of Nations. The Anti-Slavery Society estimated there were 2 million slaves in the early 1930s out of an estimated population of between 8 and 16 million.

He described in the whole of Chapter 14 his efforts to eradicate slavery, which he noted was a persistent custom in Ethiopia arising from intertribal wars, where the captured slaves could hardly be distinguished in appearance from their owners and sometimes even married them. The slave trade had already been banned unsuccessfully by his predecessors Tewodros II, Yohannes IV and Menelik II. Beginning in 1924, Haile Selassie I began doing everything possible to liberate all remaining slaves in Ethiopia, enrolling many of them in education programs.

Despite all this, Haile Selassie asserted that Benito Mussolini's propaganda agents (Haile Selassie singled out the Italian consul at Harar in particular) were constantly broadcasting to the world many false reports that slavery was still being promoted in Ethiopia, in an attempt to influence world opinion against Ethiopia, have Ethiopia indicted in the League of Nations, and create a casus belli for the invasion, genocide, and attempted recolonization of Ethiopia with Italians.

"Again, when in 1923 (= 1931) a delegation, sent by the British Anti-Slavery Society, came to Addis Ababa, We informed them orally and in writing, after a great deal of discussion, that We shall see to it that within fifteen or, at most, twenty years from now all slaves would go free and that slavery would be totally eliminated from Ethiopia. But in any country a few offenders must always be expected, and if some men are found transgressing the proclamation that has been promulgated, all the foreign envoys know that We have punished them even with the death penalty. Therefore, Our conscience does not rebuke Us, for We have done unceasingly everything possible as regards the liberation of the slaves."

The institution of slavery was again abolished by order of the Italian occupying forces. On 26 August 1942, during the Second Modernization, Haile Selassie issued a proclamation completely outlawing all slavery.

== Second modernization ==
Following the Second World War, Haile Selassie opened Ethiopia's first university. The University College of Addis Ababa was founded in 1950. In 1962, it was renamed Haile Selassie I University but is currently known as Addis Ababa University.

In 1955, the 1931 Constitution of Ethiopia was replaced with the 1955 Constitution of Ethiopia, extending the power of Parliament. Haile Selassie improved diplomatic ties with the United States, as well as Ethiopia's relationship with the rest of Africa. He initiated the Organization of African Unity in 1963.
