= My Life and Ethiopia's Progress =

Autobiography of Haile Selassie I

- Author: Haile Selassie I
- Original title: ሕይወቴና የኢትዮጵያ እርምጃ
- Translator: Edward Ullendorff; Exekiel Gebissa
- Language: Amharic
- Genre: Autobiography
- Publication date: 1973; 1974
- English publication date: 1976; 1994

My Life and Ethiopia's Progress (Amharic:- ሕይወቴና የኢትዮጵያ እርምጃ [Hiywotenna ye'Ityopp'ya 'Irmijja]) is the autobiography of Emperor of Ethiopia Haile Selassie I, written over the course of his life, and published in two volumes in 1973–74.

== Creation and publication ==
The first volume covers 1892–1937, from Haile Selassie's birth until the Second Italo-Ethiopian War. He began writing it while in exile in Bath, England during that war; it covers his life and the administration and modernization of Ethiopia up to that point. The second volume covers 1936–1942, and Ethiopia's occupation by Italy and return to independence. Both volumes were edited extensively by assistant writers after Haile Selassie I's return to Ethiopia. They were published in Ethiopia in 1973 and 1974; English translations were published in 1976 and 1999, respectively.

Haile Selassie I wrote with an eye towards the political impact of publication, and addressed questions about the legitimacy of his power and position, and about his flight into exile in 1936. He published the books while he was still in power, shortly before he was deposed in a military coup in 1974. In 1976 it was translated from Amharic into English and annotated by Edward Ullendorff in an Oxford University Press publication.

== Quotes ==
Haile Selassie wrote in the preface:

"A house built on granite and strong foundations, not even the onslaught of pouring rain, gushing torrents and strong winds will be able to pull down. Some people have written the story of my life representing as truth what in fact derives from ignorance, error or envy; but they cannot shake the truth from its place, even if they attempt to make others believe it."

== See also ==
- Ethiopian historiography
