= Manuel de Almeida =

Portuguese Jesuit missionary (1580–1646)

- Born: Manuel de Almeida; 1580; Viseu, Kingdom of Portugal
- Died: 1646 (aged 65–66); Goa, Portuguese India
- Occupations: Missionary, traveller
- Known for: Traveller and builder of churches and monasteries in Ethiopia and Eritrea.

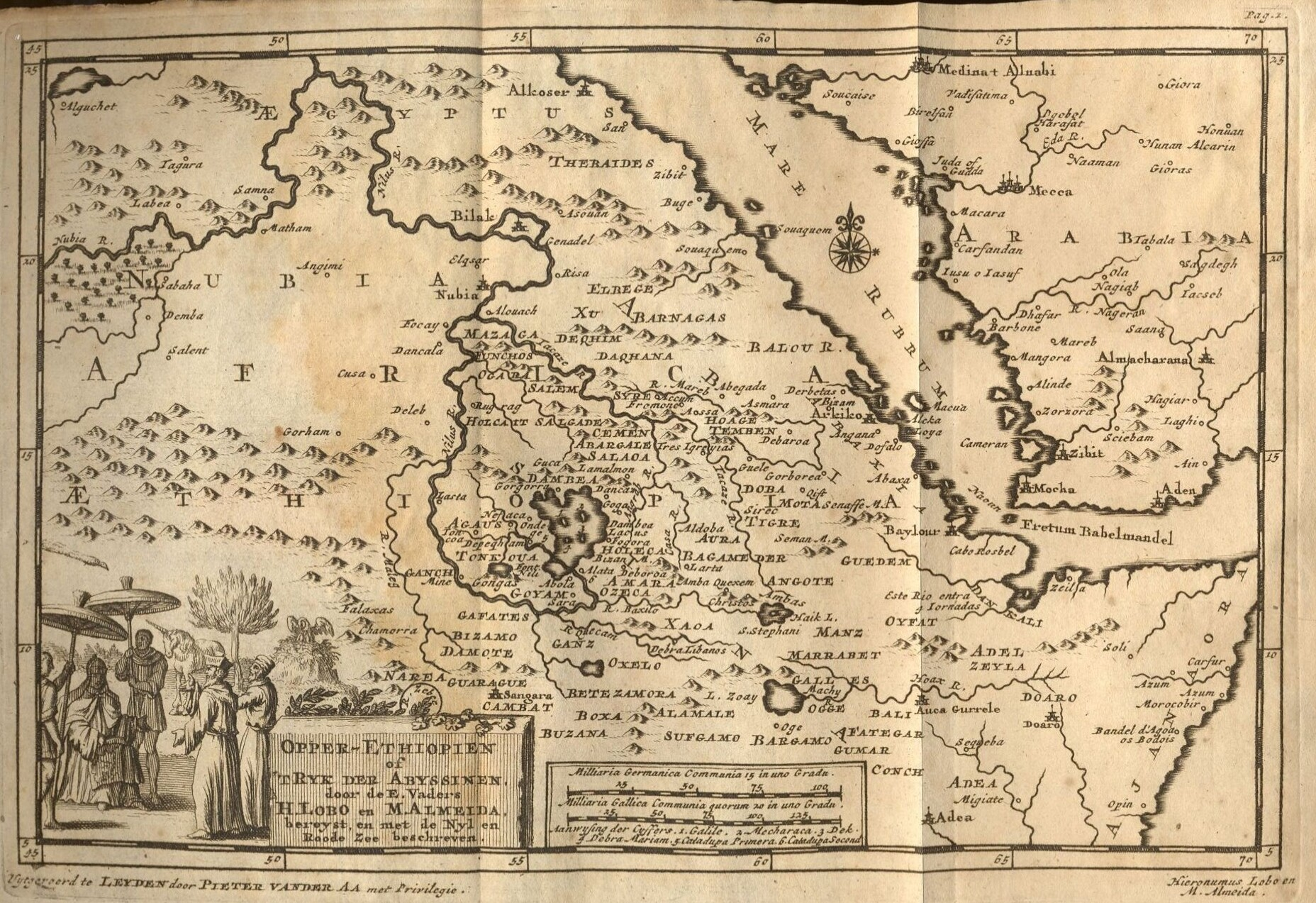
Map from the Dutch edition of Historia de Etiopía a Alta ou Abassia

Manuel de Almeida (sometimes Manoel de Almeida, 1580–1646) was a Portuguese Jesuit missionary. Born in Viseu, Portugal, he is prominent for his 17th-century sojourns in Ethiopia, parts of modern-day Eritrea, and Lake Tana, where he built a number of churches and monasteries, particularly on the small islands of the lake.

In 1622, Almeida was selected by the general of his order as ambassador to the Emperor of Ethiopia, Susenyos. Accompanied by three companions, Almeida left Bassein 28 November of that year for Suakin, and reached Diu two months later; he was delayed at the port of Dhofar from 18 May 1623 to 16 October due to unfavorable winds. At last Almeida departed for Suakin, reaching it 4 December, where he received a pass from the local Pasha to pass through the territories of the Ottoman Empire. He then found passage to Massawa, whence he made his way to Fremona by way of Debarwa (where he met the governor of Tigray, Ras Keba Krestos), reaching the Catholic base in January 1624.

He was well received by Emperor Susenyos, but his successor Fasilides first exiled him and his fellow Jesuits to Fremona in 1633. Almeida was selected, along with Manoel Barradas and two other priests, to return to Goa and seek help from the Portuguese authorities for the missionaries; however, he made slow progress and by the time he reached Diu, most of his fellow Jesuits, who had been subsequently expelled from the country, had caught up with him. Upon returning to India, after thirteen years' absence, Almeida was made provincial of his order, and inquisitor. There he died.

Almeida wrote a history of Ethiopia, Historia de Etiopía a Alta ou Abassia, which drew on his own experiences as well as the writings of previous missionaries like Pedro Páez. The Historia was never published during Almeida's lifetime; but an abridgment and partial revision of Almeida's work by Baltazar Téllez was printed at Coimbra in 1660; an anonymous translation of Tellez's work into English appeared in 1710. Selections from Historia work were translated into English by C.F. Beckingham and G.W.B. Huntingford and published in Some Records of Ethiopia, 1593-1646 (London: Hakluyt Society, 1954).

== See also ==
- Ethiopian Studies
