= Yetmen =

- Location in Ethiopia
- Coordinates: 10°20′N 38°8′E
- Country: Ethiopia
- Region: Amhara Region
- Zone: Misraq Gojjam Zone
- Elevation: 2,541 m (8,337 ft)

Population (2005)
  - Total: 2,896 (est)
- Time zone: UTC+3 (EAT)

Yetmen (Amharic: የትመን) is a town in west-central Ethiopia. Located in the Misraq Gojjam Zone of the Amhara Region on the hillside overlooking the Abay River, it has a latitude and longitude of 10°20′N 38°8′E and an elevation of 2396 meters above sea level. It is one of two towns in Enemay woreda.

In 1996, the people in Yetmen got access to clean drinking water. Many people in the urban site have their own piped water supply, while many people in the rural site use their own water wells for many household chores. The following year, electricity was provided to the town as well as nearby rural houses. An all-weather road crosses Yetmen, connecting the town to Bichena, the administrative center of the woreda, to the north and to Dejen in the opposite direction. The town has a market which was held three days a week in 2005: on Tuesdays, Thursdays, and Saturday .

Yetmen was founded shortly after the establishment of a Swedish-built elementary school in 1968, which has since been upgraded to a junior high school. A clinic was built in 1991, and a veterinary clinic opened ten years later. A survey performed in 2005 revealed that the inhabitants have a plan to upgrade Yetmen's status to a municipal town, believing that this will provide opportunities for non-farming activities, thus improving the lives of the people including the farmers.

== Demographics ==
Based on figures from the Central Statistical Agency in 2005, Yetmen has an estimated total population of 2,896, of whom 1,382 are men and 1,514 are women. The 1994 census reported this town had a total population of 1,676 of whom 727 were men and 949 were women. The largest ethnic group reported in this town was the Amhara, and the majority of the inhabitants spoke Amharic (99.64%). The majority of the inhabitants practiced Ethiopian Orthodox Christianity, with 98.27% reporting that as their religion, while 0.73% were Muslim.
