= List of bridges in Ethiopia =

== Historical or architectural interest bridges ==
| | Name | Distinction | Length | Type | Carries Crosses | Opened | Location | Region | Ref. |
|---|---|---|---|---|---|---|---|---|---|
| 1 | Portuguese Bridge | | 64 m (210 ft) | Masonry; 1 main arch, 6 secondary arches | Footbridge; Blue Nile | 17th century | Tissisat; 11°29′14.7″N 37°35′39.4″E | Amhara | (Note: Also called Alata Bridge.) |
| 2 | Sebara Dildiy Bridge | | 60 m (200 ft) | Masonry; 10 arches | Footbridge; Blue Nile | 17th century | Gale; 11°13′3.4″N 37°52′36.8″E | Amhara| (Note: Also called Fasil Bridge or the Second Portuguese Bridge.) | |
| 3 | Defeche Bridge | | 36 m (118 ft) | Masonry; 4 arches | Footbridge; Gilgel Megech River | 17th century | Gondar; 12°36′15.6″N 37°29′7.3″E | Amhara | (Note: Also called Defecha Bridge.) |
| 4 | Genfokuch Bridge | | 36 m (118 ft) | Masonry | Footbridge; Gilgel Megech River | 17th century | Gondar; 12°34′27.2″N 37°27′42.9″E | Amhara | (Note: Also called Gobatit Bridge or Seytan Metaya Bridge.) |
| 5 | Debre Libanos Bridge | | 33 m (108 ft) | Masonry; 3 arches | Footbridge; Gur River | | Fiche; 9°44′1.7″N 38°48′49.8″E | Oromia | (Note: Also called Ras Darge's Bridge or Portuguese Bridge.) |
| 6 | Mereb Bridge | Eritrea–Ethiopia border | | Truss; Steel | Road bridge Mareb River | | Rama–Adi Quala; 14°28′21.8″N 38°46′29.8″E | Tigray; Eritrea | |
| 7 | Suspension bridge (Sebara Dildi) | Build by Bridges to Prosperity organization | | Suspension; Steel, wooden deck | Footbridge; Blue Nile | 2009 | Gale; 11°13′01.6″N 37°52′41.8″E | Amhara | |
| 8 | Alata Suspension bridge | Span : 81 m (266 ft) | | Suspension; Steel | Footbridge | 2011 | Tissisat; 11°29′31.7″N 37°35′22.9″E | Amhara | |
| 9 | Awash Railway Grand Bridge | Height : 71 m (233 ft) | 155 m (509 ft) | Box girder Prestressed concrete 40+64+40 | Addis Ababa–Djibouti Railway; Awash River | 2018 | Awash; 9°01′42.0″N 40°10′55.3″E | Afar | |

== Major bridges ==
| | Name | Span | Length | Type | Carries Crosses | Opened | Location | Region | Ref. |
|---|---|---|---|---|---|---|---|---|---|
| 1 | Abay River Bridge under construction | 180 m (590 ft) | 380 m (1,250 ft) | Extradosed; Concrete box girder deck, concrete pylons Twin bridges 100+180+100 | National A3; Trans-African Highway 4 Blue Nile | 2023 | Bahir Dar; 11°35′15.3″N 37°24′28.2″E | Amhara | |
| 2 | New Abbay Bridge | 145 m (476 ft) | 303 m (994 ft) | Extradosed; Concrete box girder deck, concrete pylons 78+145+78 | National A3 Addis Ababa-Goha Tsion Trunk Road; Blue Nile | 2008 | Dejen; 10°04′32.9″N 38°11′29.2″E | Amhara | |
| 3 | Omo Bridge | 128 m (420 ft) | | Truss; Steel | Omo River | 2013 | Omorate; 4°48′45.1″N 36°2′56″E | Southern Nations, Nationalities, and Peoples' Region | |
| 4 | Abay No.8 Bridge | | 285 m (935 ft) | Box girder Prestressed concrete | B21 road Blue Nile | 2015 | Wegde; 10°39′50.0″N 38°30′12.6″E | Amhara | |
| 5 | Abbay Bridge | | 210 m (690 ft) | Arch; Concrete deck arch | National A3; Blue Nile | 1948 | Dejen; 10°04′30.1″N 38°11′25.4″E | Amhara | |

== See also ==
- Transport in Ethiopia
- Rail transport in Ethiopia
- Geography of Ethiopia
- List of rivers of Ethiopia
