= Yejube =

Town in Amhara Region, Ethiopia

Yejube (also transliterated Ejube) is a town in west-central Ethiopia. Located in the Misraq Gojjam Zone of the Amhara Region, it has a latitude and longitude of 10°09′N 37°45′E and an elevation of 2211 meters above sea level. It is the largest town and the capital of Baso Liben woreda.

Economy

Yejube and the surrounding Baso Liben wereda is the main source of wheat and teff. the suitable climate and soil makes the woreda the excess producer of wheat. The wereda also produces corn, barley and other oil seed crops.

In the town small scale trade as the main economic activity. traders purchase different cereals mainly wheat from the farmers and selling to the main stream market in Debre Markos and addis ababa. this fuels the other economic activities like small hotels, and restaurants.

Religion

Around 90 percent of the town residents are orthodox Christians. The rest are Muslims and Protestants. The town has two churches and one mosque. st George church is one of the oldest churches in the country built in the 14th century. contraction of modern building for the church was being completed in 2014 and it is one of the biggest structure in the whole woreda. celebration of timket, and st. George day is few of the biggest holidays in the town.The second church is Adisu St.Michael church it build in recent year, found at the back of Yejubie General Secondary School.

The British traveller C.T. Beke visited this town 12 May 1842, describing it in his report to the Geographical Journal as "a large commercial town close to the market of Baso." Yejube was visited by another European, C.F. Rey, on 9 January 1926, who described the settlement as "a large village of about 1500 inhabitants situated on an open plain near extensive marshes where duck and other wildfowl were plentiful."

== Demographics ==
Based on figures from the Central Statistical Agency in 2005, Yejube has an estimated total population of 6,502, of whom 3,258 are men and 3,244 are women. The 1994 census reported this town had a total population of 3,717 of whom 1,714 were men and 2,033 were women.

Attracsion sites

The woreda has a man made bridge on the biggest river dividing the woreda into two called Wiregreg
