= Hulet Ej Enese =

Coordinates: 11°15′N 37°45′E

Hulet Ejju Enesie
- Woreda
- Flag
- Interactive map of Hulet Ejju Enesie
- Zone: Misraq Gojjam
- Region: Amhara Region

Area
  - Total: 1,496.69 km^{2} (577.88 sq mi)

Population (2012 est.)
  - Total: 301,462
  - Density: 201.42/km^{2} (521.67/sq mi)

Hulet Ej Enese is one of the woredas in the Amhara Region of Ethiopia. Part of the Misraq Gojjam Zone, it is bordered on the south by Debay Telatgen, on the west by Bibugn and Goncha, on the northwest by the Mirab Gojjam Zone, on the north by the Abay River (which separates it from the Debub Gondar Zone), on the east by Goncha Siso Enese, and on the southeast by Enarj Enawga. Among the towns in this administrative division are Keraniyo, Mota and Sede.

Rivers in Hulet Ej Enese include the Tammi, a tributary of the Abay. The Sabero Dilde (also known as the "Second Portuguese Bridge" or the "Broken Bridge") crosses the Abay here, connecting Hulet Ej Enese with Andabet woreda, a woreda in Debub Gondar.

== Demographics ==
A 2012 estimate puts the population at 301,452. This gives a population density of 201.42 people per square kilometer (521.67 people per square mile), given its area of 1,496.69 square kilometers (521.67 square miles), higher than the East Gojjam Zone average of 167.94 people per square kilometer (434.95 people per square mile).

Based on the 2007 national census conducted by the Central Statistical Agency of Ethiopia (CSA), this woreda has a total population of 275,638, an increase of 38.27% compared to the 1994 census, of whom 137,382 are men and 138,256 women; 30,594 or 11.10% are urban inhabitants. With an area of 1,496.69 square kilometers, Hulet Ej Enese has a population density of 184.17 people per square kilometer (476.98 people per square mile), which is greater than the Zone average of 153.80 people per square kilometer (398.35 people per square mile). A total of 64,272 households were counted in this woreda, resulting in an average of 4.29 persons to a household, and 62,477 housing units.

The majority of the inhabitants practiced Ethiopian Orthodox Christianity, with 95.3% reporting that as their religion, while 4.66% of the population said they were Muslim.

The 1994 national census reported a total population for this woreda of 199,352 in 39,245 households, of whom 99,829 were men and 99,523 were women; 20,554 or 10.31% of its population were urban dwellers. The largest ethnic group reported in Hulet Ej Enese was the Amhara (99.93%). The majority of the inhabitants practiced Ethiopian Orthodox Christianity, with 93.37% reporting that as their religion, while 6.55% were Muslim.
