= Dima, Gojjam =

Village in Amhara Region, Ethiopia

Dima (Amharic: ዲማ) is a village in west-central Ethiopia. Located in the Misraq Gojjam Zone of the Amhara Region, it has a latitude and longitude of 10°33′14″N 38°13′19″E and an elevation of 2400 meters above sea level. It is one of three bigger settlements in Enemay woreda.

Notable landmarks in Dima include a church dedicated to Saint George, as well as its venerable monastery, Dima Giyorgis, which was a place of refuge. The Central Statistical Agency did not provide an estimate of its population in 2005.

== History ==
The monastery of Dima is mentioned in the reign of Emperor Susenyos as the location where Ras Antenatewos of Begemder, the chief supporter of Yaqob, found refuge after his side was defeated in the Battle of Gol in 1607.

The British traveller C.T. Beke came to the town in November 1841 to pay a visit to Dejazmach Goshu Zewde, who had sought refuge at Dima at the time due to the revolt of his son Birru Goshu. At the time of Beke's visit, he found Dima to be a large town "apparently of recent construction, divided into quarters, which are surrounded by stone walls; many of the houses are also constructed of the same material. The church of St. George is the largest edifice of the kind which I have seen in Abyssinia, and internally the walls are adorned with paintings, much in the style of those of the middle ages in Europe." Beke was preceded in his visit to the Dejazmach by the Belgian consul Blondeel.

== New projects ==
Dima Industries and service s.c was established in June 2020. It has five areas of investment: 1, community service centers, like an international hotel, referral hospital and education 2, agro-processing and industry 3, construction and machinery renting 4, import/export 5, manufacturing

As of November 2020 the first project, the hospital building, is in process and is scheduled to be completed in 3 years.

=== Summary ===
Problem statement: Majority of the rural people of Amhara at large, East Gojjam, specifically enemay woreda is poor and also depend on government health structures for remedies from illness in the area. Ethiopian health sector since 15 years back achieved much progress in public health domain, but the rich and the politically blessed can extract major services from the public health system. public health has played a vital role in protecting and promoting the health of rural communities across the nation. In many of these communities, public health offices and personnel are the only providers of health services. As the existing infrastructure erodes, additional and greater demands are being made on an already underfunded and understaffed public health system to meet both its core functions and provide clinical care. Although, there has been dramatic improvement in the private sector health system, but unfortunately, they are meant to serve the rich only. Also, they are not going further than the usual OPD treatment. Project objectives: the project is completed in two phases 1, establish referral hospital serving quality of care and decrease referral to far places like Adis Abeba and Bahirdar. So that the project is being taken so that the people can get good health service from this hospital with lower expenditure. 2, establish a medical college and fills the gaps of human resources in the country in the field of medical doctors and specialists.

Project duration: this project will take about 3 years to complete. Total budget: 200 million birr. job opportunities: 250 permanent and about 100 temporary = 350 opportunities to the area.
