= Machakel =

District in Amhara Region, Ethiopia

Coordinates: 10°40′N 37°20′E

- Woreda
- Flag
- Interactive map of Machakel
- Zone: Misraq Gojjam
- Region: Amhara Region

Area
  - Total: 746.43 km^{2} (288.20 sq mi)

Population (2012 est.)
  - Total: 128,495
  - Density: 172.15/km^{2} (445.86/sq mi)

Machakel is a woreda in Amhara Region, Ethiopia. Part of the Misraq Gojjam Zone, Machakel is bordered on the south by Debre Elias, on the northwest by the Mirab Gojjam Zone, on the east by Sinan, and on the southeast by Guzamn. Towns in Machakel include Amanuel. Woreda of Debre Elias was separated from Machakel.

== Demographics ==
A 2012 estimate puts the population at 128,495. This gives a population density of 172.15 people per square kilometer (445.86 people per square mile), given its area of 746.43 square kilometers (288.20 square miles), lower than the East Gojjam Zone average of 167.94 people per square kilometer (434.95 people per square mile).

Based on the 2007 national census conducted by the Central Statistical Agency of Ethiopia (CSA), this woreda has a total population of 118,097, an increase of -37.34% over the 1994 census, of whom 58,529 are men and 59,568 women; 8,728 or 7.39% are urban inhabitants. With an area of 746.43 square kilometers, Machakel has a population density of 158.22 people per square kilometer (409.77 people per square mile), which is greater than the Zone average of 153.80 people per square kilometer (398.35 people per square mile). A total of 27,967 households were counted in this woreda, resulting in an average of 4.22 persons to a household, and 27,143 housing units.

The 1994 national census reported a total population for this woreda of 188,472 in 38,915 households, of whom 94,269 were men and 94,203 were women; 9,439 or 5.01% of its population were urban dwellers.

The largest ethnic group reported in1994 in Machakel was the Amhara (99.92%). The majority of the inhabitants practiced Ethiopian Orthodox Christianity, with 98.77% reporting that as their religion, while 1.15% were Muslim. In 2007 this had changed little, with 98.87% reporting Ethiopian Orthodox Christianity as their religion, while 1.1% of the population said they were Muslim.
