= Shebel Berenta =

District in Amhara Region, Ethiopia

Coordinates: 10°30′N 38°10′E

- Woreda
- Flag
- Interactive map of Shebel Berenta
- Zone: Misraq Gojjam
- Region: Amhara Region

Area
  - Total: 898.37 km^{2} (346.86 sq mi)

Population (2012 est.)
  - Total: 112,619
  - Density: 125.36/km^{2} (324.68/sq mi)

Shebel Berenta is a woreda in Amhara Region, Ethiopia, named after two older districts which occupy the area this woreda currently covers: Berenta which is north of the Mecha river, and Shebel which is south of that stream. Part of the Misraq Gojjam Zone, Shebel Berenta is bordered on the southwest by Dejen, on the northwest by Enemay, on the north by Enarj Enawga, and on the east by the Abay River which separates it from the Oromia Region. The major town in Shebel Berenta is Yed Wuha.

In 2002, Shebel Berenta was judged to be one of four chronically food insecure woredas in this part of the Amhara Region, due to much of their farmland being "extremely depleted, deforested and eroded".

== Demographics ==
A 2012 estimate puts the population at 112,619. This gives a population density of 125.36 people per square kilometer (324.68 people per square mile), given its area of 898.37 square kilometers (346.86 square miles), lower than the East Gojjam Zone average of 167.94 people per square kilometer (434.95 people per square mile).

Based on the 2007 national census conducted by the Central Statistical Agency of Ethiopia (CSA), this woreda has a total population of 103,988, an increase of 35.39% over the 1994 census, of whom 50,938 are men and 53,050 women; 4,230 or 4.07% are urban inhabitants. With an area of 898.37 square kilometers, Shebel Berenta has a population density of 115.75 people per square kilometer (299.80 people per square mile), which is less than the Zone average of 153.80 people per square kilometer (398.35 people per square mile). A total of 24,584 households were counted in this woreda, resulting in an average of 4.23 persons to a household, and 23,942 housing units.

The 1994 national census reported a total population for this woreda of 76,807 in 17,407 households, of whom 37,761 were men and 39,046 were women; 1,668 or 2.17% of its population were urban dwellers.

The largest ethnic group reported in Shebel Berenta in 1994 was the Amhara (99.93%). The majority of the inhabitants practiced Ethiopian Orthodox Christianity, with 93.82% reporting that as their religion, while 6.1% were Muslim. By 2007 this had changed little, with 94.86% reporting Ethiopian Orthodox Christianity as their religion, while 5.07% of the population said they were Muslim. This is a considerable difference from when C.T. Beke passed through the district in November 1841, when he found the inhabitants were "Mietta Gallas, nominally subject to the ruler of Gojam, whose hold on them would, however, appear to be not very strong."
