= Sinan (woreda) =

District in Amhara Region, Ethiopia

Sinan ስናን
- Woreda
- Flag
- Zone: Misraq Gojjam
- Region: Amhara

Area
  - Total: 426.72 km^{2} (164.76 sq mi)

Population (2012 est.)
  - Total: 107,232
  - Density: 251.29/km^{2} (650.85/sq mi)

Sinan (Amharic: ስናን) is one of the woredas (districts) in the Amhara Region of Ethiopia. Part of the Misraq Gojjam Zone, Sinan is bordered on the southwest by Guzamn, on the west by Machakel, on the north by Bibugn, on the northwest by Debay Telatgen, on the east by Awabel, and on the south by Aneded. Towns in Sinan include Rob Gebeya. Sinan was part of Guzamn woreda.

The highest point in the woreda as well as in the Misraq Gojjam Zone is Mount Choqa (also known as Mount Birhan), a part of the Choqa Mountains, with an elevation of 4,154 m (13,629 ft) above sea level.

== Demographics ==
A 2012 estimate puts the population at 107,232. This gives a population density of 251.29 people per square kilometer (650.85 people per square mile), given its area of 426.72 square kilometers (164.76 square miles), much higher than the East Gojjam Zone average of 167.94 people per square kilometer (434.95 people per square mile).

Based on the 2007 national census conducted by the Central Statistical Agency of Ethiopia (CSA), the woreda has a total population of 98,939, of whom 49,423 are men and 49,516 women; 4,562 or 4.61% are urban inhabitants.

The majority of the inhabitants, 95.97%, practice Ethiopian Orthodox Christianity.
