= Baso Liben =

District in Amhara Region, Ethiopia

Coordinates: 10°10′N 37°35′E

Baso Liben ባሶ ሊበን
- Woreda
- Flag
- Interactive map of Baso Liben
- Zone: Misraq Gojjam
- Region: Amhara

Area
  - Total: 1,118.56 km^{2} (431.88 sq mi)

Population (2012 est.)
  - Total: 149,937
  - Density: 134.04/km^{2} (347.17/sq mi)

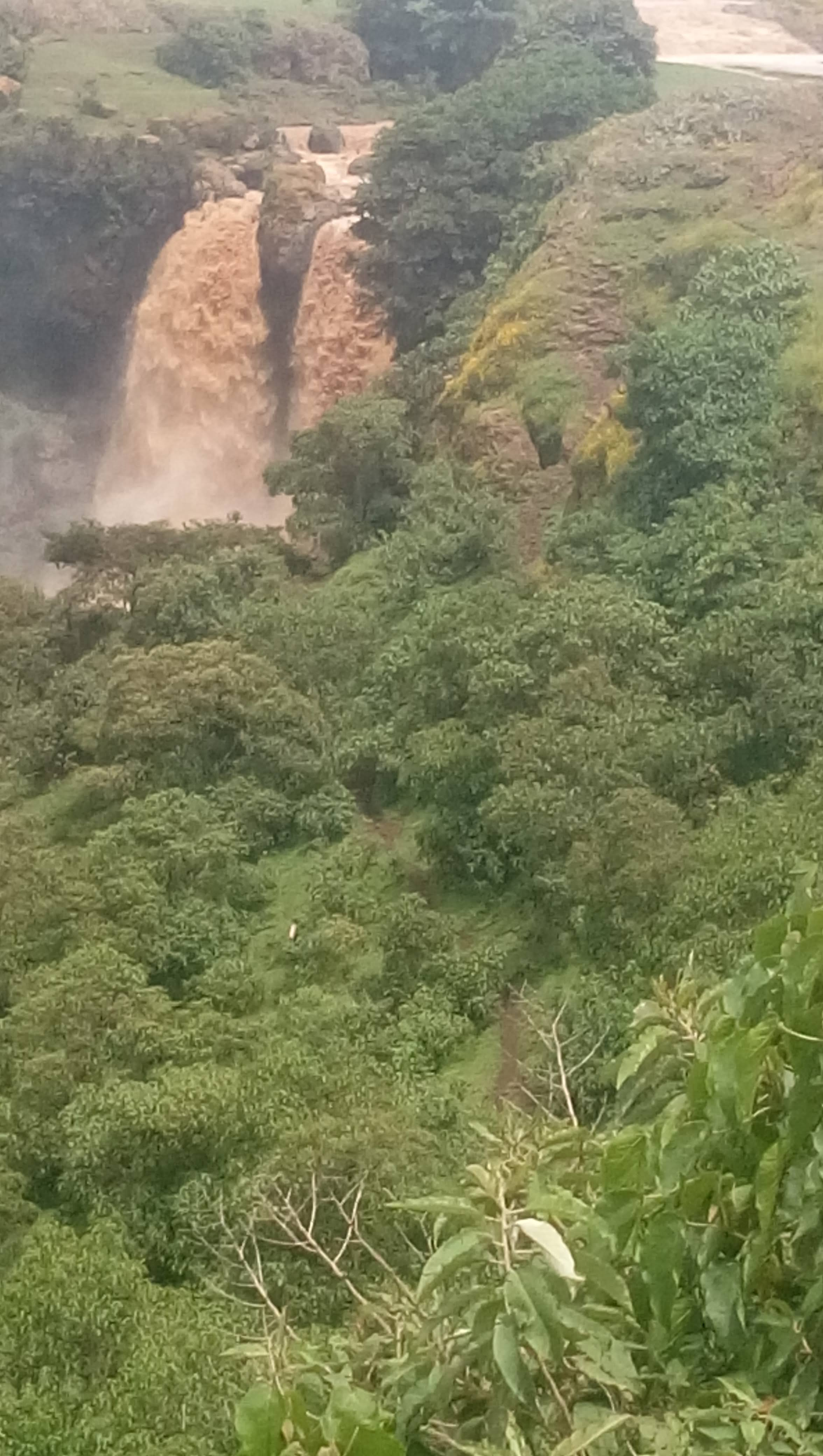

Baso Liben (Amharic: ባሶ ሊበን) is one of the woredas in the Amhara Region of Ethiopia. A triangular-shaped district at the southernmost point of the Misraq Gojjam Zone, Baso Liben is bordered on the south by a bend of the Blue Nile river which separates it from the Oromia Region, on the northwest by the Chamwaga river which separates it from Gozamn, and on the northeast by Aneded. The major town in Baso Liben is Yejube. there are two other small towns; Kork and Yelamgeji with significant trading activity

The woreda is surrounded by large gorges and lowlands of Abay river in the south and south east where significant investment is happening in sesame, mung bean and other cereals.

The woreda has small rivers Yada being the biggest, and the Sens which is a tributary of the Chamwaga. Several fords have been used since time immemorial to cross the Blue Nile from Baso Liben into the Guduru and Cheliya woredas in the Oromia Region, which are, in order flowing downriver: the Balanti, Malka, Malka Kuki, Malka Fursi, and Malka Yekatel.

== Demographics ==
A 2012 estimate puts the population at 149,937. With an area of 1,118.56 square kilometers (431.88 square miles), Baso Liben has a population density of 134.05 people per square kilometer (347.17 people per square mile), which is less than the East Gojjam Zone average of 167.94 people per square kilometer (434.95 people per square mile).

Based on the 2007 national census conducted by the Central Statistical Agency of Ethiopia (CSA), the woreda has a total population of 138,332, an increase of 22.74% from the 1994 census, of whom 68,034 are men and 70,298 women; 6,439 or 4.65% are urban inhabitants. A total of 31,760 households were counted in this woreda, resulting in an average of 4.36 persons to a household, and 31,200 housing units.

The majority of the inhabitants practiced Ethiopian Orthodox Christianity, with 99.09% reporting that as their religion.

The 1994 national census reported a total population for this woreda of 112,707 in 24,320 households, of whom 56,339 were men and 56,368 were women; 3,747 or 3.32% of its population were urban dwellers. The largest ethnic group reported in Baso Liben was the Amhara (99.91%). The majority of the inhabitants practiced Ethiopian Orthodox Christianity, with 98.59% reporting that as their religion, while 1.33% were Muslim. However, Charles Beke, who travelled through this area in 1842, states that groups of Oromos had settled in this part of Gojjam, the names of their tribes becoming the names of these districts.

Economy

The woreda is known for its abundant production of different agricultural products mainly cereals including wheat, teff, maize, barley where the woreda is one of the surplus producers in the country. Sesame, Niger seed and other oil seeds are widely available in the woreda. In the past few years the Kola part of the woreda become the main investment attraction for investors engaged in oilseed producers. Surplus production of wheat and teff resulted vibrant trading activities in the main towns of the woreda. Many traders collect these commodities from the farmers, sell to the big ciwidelyke Debre Markos and Addis Ababa. in addition trading activities are the main business and employment source in the cities.

Investment

Apart from agriculture and trading, there are small industrial activity, two floor factories and a plastic factory started operation in the woreda. Furthermore, small scale iron work, wood work and construction material production are the growing industrial activities in the Woreda. The service sector is also growing in the woreda where small hotels are available in Yejube providing food and hospitality service. With the growing economic activities, the transport sector is on of the growing economic activity.

Challenges of the woreda

Despite its potential for agriculture and other economic activities, its location far from the main transport links of the country is the biggest disadvantage for the woreda. Lack of asphalt rode that connect the woreda with the main road hinders investment activities in the woreda.
