= Aneded =

District in Amhara Region, Ethiopia

- Woreda
- Flag
- Zone: Misraq Gojjam
- Region: Amhara

Area
  - Total: 679.42 km^{2} (262.33 sq mi)

Population (2012 est.)
  - Total: 98,502
  - Density: 144.98/km^{2} (375.50/sq mi)

Aneded is one of the woredas in the Amhara Region of Ethiopia. Part of the Misraq Gojjam Zone, Aneded is bordered on the south by the Abay River which separates it from the Oromia Region, on the southwest by Baso Liben, on the northwest by Guzamn, on the north by Sinan, and on the east by Awabel. Towns in Awabel include Amber. Aneded was part of Awabel woreda.

== Demographics ==
A 2012 estimate puts the population at 98,502. This gives a population density of 144.98 people per square kilometer (375.50 people per square mile), given its area of 679.42 square kilometers (262.33 square miles), lower than the East Gojjam Zone average of 167.94 people per square kilometer (434.95 people per square mile).

Based on the 2007 national census conducted by the Central Statistical Agency of Ethiopia (CSA), this woreda has a total population of 91,224, of whom 45,408 are men and 45,816 women; 1,778 or 1.95% are urban inhabitants.

The majority of the inhabitants practiced Ethiopian Orthodox Christianity, with 98.87% reporting that as their religion, while 1.1% of the population said they were Muslim.
