= Debay Telatgen =

Coordinates: 10°45′N 37°50′E

- Woreda
- Flag
- Interactive map of Debay Telatgen
- Zone: Misraq Gojjam
- Region: Amhara Region

Area
  - Total: 626.14 km^{2} (241.75 sq mi)

Population (2012 est.)
  - Total: 138,642
  - Density: 221.42/km^{2} (573.48/sq mi)

Debay Telatgen is one of the woredas in the Amhara Region of Ethiopia. Part of the Misraq Gojjam Zone, Debay Telatgen is bordered on the extreme south by Dejen, on the southwest by Awabel, on the west by Sinan, on the northwest by Bibugn, on the north by Hulet Ej Enese, on the northeast by Enarj Enawga, and on the east by Enemay. The major town in Debay Telatgen is Kuyi.

This woreda was selected as one of the areas for Agri-Service Ethiopia to develop an Integrated Rural Development Program in 1987. This Program assisted 10,000 heads of households with agricultural production and problems caused by overgrazing.

== Demographics ==
A 2012 estimate puts the population at 138,642. With an area of 626.14 square kilometers, Debay Tilatgen has a population density of 221.42 people per square kilometer (573.48 people per square mile), which is greater than the East Gojjam Zone average of 153.8 persons per square kilometer.

Based on the 2007 national census conducted by the Central Statistical Agency of Ethiopia (CSA), this woreda has a total population of 128,045, an increase of 28.25% over the 1994 census, of whom 64,102 are men and 63,943 women; 5,010 or 3.91% are urban inhabitants. A total of 29,043 households were counted in this woreda, resulting in an average of 4.41 persons to a household, and 28,205 housing units.

The majority of the inhabitants practiced Ethiopian Orthodox Christianity, with 99.43% reporting that as their religion.

The 1994 national census reported a total population for this woreda of 99,840 in 22,060 households, of whom 50,591 were men and 49,249 were women; 2,162 or 2.17% of its population were urban dwellers. The largest ethnic group reported in Debay Telatgen was the Amhara (99.95%). The majority of the inhabitants practiced Ethiopian Orthodox Christianity, with 99.47% reporting that as their religion, while 3.69% were Muslim.
