= Keraniyo =

- Town
- Location in Ethiopia
- Coordinates: 10°58′0″N 37°58′0″E
- Country: Ethiopia
- Region: Ahmara
- Zone: Misraq Gojjam
- District: Hulet Ej Enese
- Time zone: UTC+3 (East Africa Time)
- Area code: (+251) 11

Keraniyo is an Ethiopian town in the district (woreda) of Hulet Ej Enese, part of Misraq Gojjam Zone, Amhara Region.
