= Debre Elias =

District in Amhara Region, Ethiopia

Debre Elias ደብረ ኤልያስ
- Woreda
- Flag
- Zone: Misraq Gojjam
- Region: Amhara

Area
  - Total: 1,165.65 km^{2} (450.06 sq mi)

Population (2010 est.)
  - Total: 89,665
  - Density: 76.923/km^{2} (199.23/sq mi)

Debre Elias (Amharic: ደብረ ኤልያስ) is a woreda in Amhara Region, Ethiopia. Part of the Misraq Gojjam Zone, Debre Elias is bordered on the south and west by the Abay River which separates it from the Oromia Region, on the northwest by the Mirab Gojjam Zone, on the north by Machakel, and on the east by Guzamn. Towns in this woreda include Elias. Debre Elias was part of Machakel woreda.

== Demographics ==
A 2012 estimate puts the population at 89,665. This gives a population density of 76.92 people per square kilometer (199.23 people per square mile), given its area of 1,165.65 square kilometers (450.06 square miles), well below the East Gojjam Zone average of 167.94 people per square kilometer (434.95 people per square mile).

Based on the 2007 national census conducted by the Central Statistical Agency of Ethiopia (CSA), this woreda has a total population of 82,150, of whom 41,109 are men and 41,041 women; 7,928 or 9.65% are urban inhabitants.

The majority of the inhabitants practiced Ethiopian Orthodox Christianity, with 98.94% reporting that as their religion, while 1.01% of the population said they were Muslim.
