= Goncha Siso Enese =

Coordinates: 11°10′N 38°00′E

- Woreda
- Flag
- Interactive map of Goncha Siso Enese
- Zone: Misraq Gojjam
- Region: Amhara Region

Area
  - Total: 1,038.17 km^{2} (400.84 sq mi)

Population (2012 est.)
  - Total: 162,310
  - Density: 156.34/km^{2} (404.92/sq mi)

Goncha Siso Enese is one of the woredas in the Amhara Region of Ethiopia.Part of the Misraq Gojjam Zone. It has 2 town and 41 rural kebeles. Goncha Siso Enese is bordered on the south by Enarj Enawga, on the west by Hulet Ej Enese, on the north by the Abay River which separates it from the Debub Gondar Zone, and on the east by Enbise Sar Midir. The major town in Goncha Siso Enese is Ginde Weyin.

Rivers in this woreda include the Blue Nile, Bina, Azuari, Tsiwa, Chiye, and Tigdar, are among the major rivers including other small rivers., all these are tributaries of the Abay. Lake Bahire Giorgies; the third largest lake in Amhara Region found between Enesie kol and Getesemani kebele is one of the most important water body even though less is done to promote it for tourists. there are historic, cultural and religious tourism sites such as Koga Andinet Gedam, Jiret Medhanialem, Aytedash Maryam, Tsodeye and Gindewoin Maryam Gedam which rich in history.

In 2002, Goncha Siso Enese was judged to be one of four chronically food insecure woredas in this part of the Amhara Region, due to much of their farmland being "extremely depleted, deforested and eroded".

== Demographics ==
A 2012 estimate puts the population at 162,310. This gives a population density of 156.34 people per square kilometer (404.92people per square mile), given its area of 1038.17 square kilometers (400.84 square miles), lower than the East Gojjam Zone average of 167.94 people per square kilometer (434.95 people per square mile).

Based on the 2007 national census conducted by the Central Statistical Agency of Ethiopia (CSA), this woreda has a total population of 149,646, an increase of 29.66% over the 1994 census, of whom 74,347 are men and 75,299 women; 7,690 or 5.14% are urban inhabitants. With an area of 1,038.17 square kilometers, Goncha Siso Enese had a population density of 144.14 people per square kilometer (373.33 people per square mile), which is less than the zone average of 153.80 people per square kilometer (398.35 people per square mile). A total of 34,082 households were counted in this woreda, resulting in an average of 4.39 persons to a household, and 33,108 housing units.

The 1994 national census reported a total population for this woreda of 115,412 in 24,491 households, of whom 57,870 were men and 57,542 were women; 3,952 or 3.42% of its population were urban dwellers.

The largest ethnic group reported in Goncha Siso Enese was the Amhara (99.97%). The majority of the inhabitants in 1994 practiced Ethiopian Orthodox Christianity, with 98.08% reporting that as their religion, while 1.78% were Muslim. In 2007 this had changed little with 98.99% practicing Ethiopian Orthodox Christianity.
