= Wabirr =

Town in Amhara Region, Ethiopia

Wabirr is one of the towns located in Bibugn Wereda, East Gojjam Zone, Amhara Region, Ethiopia. It is located at the foot of Choqe mountain.
