= Enbise Sar Midir =

Coordinates: 11°05′N 38°15′E

Enebise Sar Midir
- Woreda
- Flag
- Interactive map of Enebise Sar Midir
- Zone: Misraq Gojjam
- Region: Amhara Region

Area
  - Total: 1,075.05 km^{2} (415.08 sq mi)

Population (2012 est.)
  - Total: 146,000
  - Density: 135.81/km^{2} (351.74/sq mi)

Enebise Sar Midir is one of the woredas in the Amhara Region of Ethiopia. This woreda is named in part after the historic district of Enebise, which was first mentioned in the 16th century. Part of the Misraq Gojjam Zone, Enbise Sar Midir is bordered on the south by Enarj Enawga, on the west by Goncha Siso Enese, and on the north and east by Abay River which separates it from the Debub Gondar Zone and Debub Wollo Zone. The administrative center of this woreda is Mertule Mariam; other towns in Enbise Sar Midir include Dibo (Amharic ፡ድቦ)and Segno Gebeya(amharic፡ ሰኞ ገበያ).

== Overview ==
The highest point in this woreda is Mount Abaminiwos, with an elevation of 3664 meters; other high points include Mount Yekendach. Other notable landmarks include the monastery at Mertule Mariam. The Abay is crossable at Daga ford, which connects this woreda with Sayint woreda in Debub Wollo.

In 2002, Enebise Sar Midir was judged to be one of four chronically food insecure woredas in this part of the Amhara Region, due to much of their farmland being "extremely depleted, deforested and eroded".

This woreda was selected as one of the three areas for Agri-Service Ethiopia to implement an Integrated Food Security Program. This Program operates in 10 of the woreda's kebeles, with the goal of improving agricultural practices, developing new rural water sources, conserving use of local natural resources, training community health workers and building new schools.

== Demographics ==
A 2012 estimate puts the population at 146,000. This gives a population density of 135.81 people per square kilometer (351.74 people per square mile), given its area of 1075.05 square kilometers (415.08 square miles), lower than the East Gojjam Zone average of 167.94 people per square kilometer (434.95 people per square mile).

Based on the 2007 national census conducted by the Central Statistical Agency of Ethiopia (CSA), this woreda has a total population of 133,855, an increase of 23.20% over the 1994 census, of whom 66,139 are men and 67,716 women; 12,259 or 9.16% are urban inhabitants. With an area of 1,075.05 square kilometers, Enbise Sar Midir has a population density of 124.51 people per square kilometer (322.48 people per square mile), which is less than the Zone average of 153.8 persons per square kilometer (398.35 people per square mile). A total of 31,612 households were counted in this woreda, resulting in an average of 4.23 persons to a household, and 30,910 housing units.

The majority of the inhabitants practiced Ethiopian Orthodox Christianity, with 98.45% reporting that as their religion, while 1.49% of the population said they were Muslim. Those Muslims are inhabited in Yisasima (Amharic ፡ይሳስማ) Kebelle, which is located east of Dibo town.

The 1994 national census reported a total population for this woreda of 108,649 in 23,351 households, of whom 54,043 were men and 54,606 were women; 7,375 or 6.79% of its population were urban dwellers. The largest ethnic group reported in Enbise Sar Midir was the Amhara (99.94%). The majority of the inhabitants practiced Ethiopian Orthodox Christianity, with 98.1% reporting that as their religion, while 1.8% were Muslim.
