= Enarj Enawga =

Coordinates: 10°50′N 38°05′E

Enarj Enawga እናርጅ እናውጋ
- Woreda
- Flag
- Interactive map of Enarj Enawga
- Zone: Misraq Gojjam
- Region: Amhara Region

Area
  - Total: 932.87 km^{2} (360.18 sq mi)

Population (2012 est.)
  - Total: 182,332
  - Density: 195.45/km^{2} (506.22/sq mi)

Enarj Enawga (Amharic: እናርጅ እናውጋ) is one of the woredas in the Amhara Region of Ethiopia. Part of the Misraq Gojjam Zone, Enarj Enawga is bordered on the south by Enemay, on the southwest by Debay Telatgen, on the west by Hulet Ej Enese, on the north by Goncha Siso Enese, on the northeast by Enbise Sar Midir, on the east by the Abbay River which separates it from the Debub Wollo Zone, and on the southeast by Shebel Berenta. Towns in Enarj Enawga include Debre Werq and Felege Berhan.

== Overview ==
In 2002, Enarg Enawga was judged to be one of four chronically food insecure woredas in this part of the Amhara Region, due to much of their farmland being "extremely depleted, deforested and eroded".

The SIDA-Amhara Rural Development Program announced in 2006 that it has opened a 31-kilometer gravel road in this woreda, which connected 15 kebeles within Enarj Enawga. This project had a 3.2 million Birr construction budget, not including 46,300 Birr in labor and material the public had contributed.

== Demographics ==
A 2012 estimate puts the population at 182,332. This gives a population density of 195.45 people per square kilometer (506.22 people per square mile), given its area of 932.87 square kilometers (360.18 square miles), higher than the East Gojjam Zone average of 167.94 people per square kilometer (434.95 people per square mile).

Based on the 2007 national census conducted by the Central Statistical Agency of Ethiopia (CSA), this woreda has a total population of 167,402, an increase of 34.22% over the 1994 census, of whom 82,958 are men and 84,444 women; 13,623 or 8.14% are urban inhabitants. With an area of 932.87 square kilometers (360.18 square miles), Enarj Enawga has a population density of 179.45 people per square kilometer (464.77 people per square mile), which is greater than the Zone average of 153.8 persons per square kilometer (398.35 people per square mile). A total of 39,564 households were counted in this woreda, resulting in an average of 4.23 persons to a household, and 38,243 housing units.

The majority of the inhabitants practiced Ethiopian Orthodox Christianity, with 97.62% reporting that as their religion, while 2.34% of the population said they were Muslim.

The 1994 national census reported a total population for this woreda of 124,720 in 26,519 households, of whom 61,861 were men and 62,859 were women; 10,009 or 8.03% of its population were urban dwellers. The largest ethnic group reported in Enarj Enawga was the Amhara (99.96%). The majority of the inhabitants practiced Ethiopian Orthodox Christianity, with 97.36% reporting that as their religion, while 2.61% were Muslim.

== Notes ==
}
