= Addis Ababa–Debre Markos Expressway =

Toll road connecting Addis Ababa and Debre Markos in Ethiopia

Route information
- Length: 317.6 km (197.3 mi)

Location
- Country: Ethiopia

Highway system
- Transport in Ethiopia

The Addis Ababa–Debre Markos Expressway is a planned toll road that will connect Addis Ababa to Debre Markos in the Amhara Region of Ethiopia. It is one of the four major expressway projects proposed as part of Ethiopia's national road expansion program. The road is being developed under a public-private partnership framework, with the Government of Ethiopia seeking private capital investment for its construction and operation, which is estimated to cost $1.64 billion.

The highway is planned to span around 300 km (186 mi), and aims to reduce congestion and improve travel time between Addis Ababa and the Amhara Region.
