= Enemay =

Coordinates: 10°40′N 38°00′E

Enemay እነማይ
- Woreda
- Flag
- Interactive map of Enemay
- Zone: Misraq Gojjam
- Region: Amhara Region

Area
  - Total: 733.02 km^{2} (283.02 sq mi)

Population (2012 est.)
  - Total: 180,858
  - Density: 246.73/km^{2} (639.03/sq mi)

Enemay (Amharic: እነማይ) is one of the woredas in the Amhara Region of Ethiopia. Part of the Misraq Gojjam Zone, Enemay is bordered on the south by Dejen, on the west by Debay Telatgen, on the north by Enarj Enawga, and on the east by Shebel Berenta. The administrative center of this woreda is Bichena; other towns in Enemay include Dima, Yetmen and Woyira, the place where Ato Temesgen Tiruneh, President of Amhara Region was born.

The landscape of this woreda is divided into two types: the lava plateau in the northern part and fertile lowlands in the south towards the Abay. Until the late 1930s as much as 25% of the land was covered with trees. Rivers in this woreda include the Muga, which is a perennial river, and the Yegudfin which only flows during the rainy season. Notable landmarks include the Wolde Beri Caves, a limestone cave system which was used as a shelter during the Italian occupation.

Soma desert is another historic place where the patriot Belay zeleke organized his force and lived to defeat the invader Italian during the second colonial attempt in the 1930s.

== Demographics ==
A 2012 estimate puts the population at 180,858. This gives a population density of 246.73 people per square kilometer (639.03 people per square mile), given its area of 733.02 square kilometers (283.02 square miles), significantly higher than the East Gojjam Zone average of 167.94 people per square kilometer (434.95 people per square mile).

Based on the 2007 national census conducted by the Central Statistical Agency of Ethiopia (CSA), this woreda has a total population of 165,292, of whom 82,175 are men and 83,117 women; 18,872 or 11.42% are urban inhabitants.

The majority of the inhabitants practiced Ethiopian Orthodox Christianity, with 92.05% reporting that as their religion, while 7.78% of the population said they were Muslim.

The 1994 national census reported a total population for this woreda of 120,914 in 24,130 households, of whom 60,022 were men and 60,892 were women; 14,160 or 11.71% of its population were urban dwellers. The largest ethnic group reported in Enemay was the Amhara (99.83%). The majority of the inhabitants practiced Ethiopian Orthodox Christianity, with 89.55% reporting that as their religion, while 10.33% were Muslim; this was the largest concentration of Muslims in Misraq Gojjam, either in numbers or percentage.
