= Gozamin =

District in Amhara Region, Ethiopia

Coordinates: 10°30′N 37°30′E

Guzamn
- Woreda
- Flag
- Interactive map of Guzamn
- Zone: Misraq Gojjam
- Region: Amhara Region

Area
  - Total: 1,173.80 km^{2} (453.21 sq mi)

Population (2012 est.)
  - Total: 143,483
  - Density: 122.238/km^{2} (316.595/sq mi)

Gozamn (Amharic: ጎዛም።) is one of the woredas in the Amhara Region of Ethiopia. Part of the East Gojjam Zone, Guzamn is bordered on the southeast by Baso Liben, on the south by the Abay River which separates it from the Oromia Region, on the west by Debre Elias, on the northwest by Machakel, on the north by Sinan, and on the east by Aneded; the Chamwaga River defines part of the border between the Guzamn and Baso Liben woredas. The town and woreda of Debre Marqos is an enclave inside Guzamn. Towns in Guzamn include Chemoga and Yebokile. Sinan woreda was separate from Guzamn.

Landmarks include the fortified mountaintops of Jebelli and Mutera, which was used as a stronghold of the rulers of Gojjam until Birru Goshu was defeated and captured by Kassa Hailu (later known as Tewodros II) in the Battle of Amba Jebelli.

== Demographics ==
A 2012 estimate puts the population at 143,483. This gives a population density of 122.24 people per square kilometer (316.60 people per square mile), given its area of 1,173.80 square kilometers (453.21 square miles), lower than the East Gojjam Zone average of 167.94 people per square kilometer (434.95 people per square mile).

Based on the 2007 national census conducted by the Central Statistical Agency of Ethiopia (CSA), this woreda has a total population of 132,883, of whom 66,348 are men and 66,535 women; 2,584 or 1.94% are urban inhabitants. With an area of 1,173.80 square kilometers, Guzamn has a population density of 113.21 people per square kilometer (293.20 people per square mile), which is less than the Zone average of 153.80 people per square kilometer (398.35 people per square mile). A total of 30,180 households were counted in this woreda, resulting in an average of 4.4 persons to a household, and 29,565 housing units.

The majority of the inhabitants practiced Ethiopian Orthodox Christianity, with 95.3% reporting that as their religion, while 4.66% of the population said they were Muslim. The majority of the inhabitants practiced Ethiopian Orthodox Christianity, with 99.97% reporting that as their religion.

The 1994 national census reported a total population for this woreda of 190,631 in 40,894 households, of whom 95,688 were men and 94,943 were women; 9,439 or 4.95% of its population were urban dwellers. The largest ethnic group reported in Guzamn was the Amhara (99.95%). The majority of the inhabitants practiced Ethiopian Orthodox Christianity, with 99.94% reporting that as their religion.
