= Dejen (woreda) =

District in Amhara Region, Ethiopia

Coordinates: 10°20′N 38°00′E

- Woreda
- Flag
- Interactive map of Dejen
- Zone: Misraq Gojjam
- Region: Amhara Region

Area
  - Total: 620.97 km^{2} (239.76 sq mi)

Population (2012 est.)
  - Total: 111,544
  - Density: 179.63/km^{2} (465.24/sq mi)

Dejen is a woreda in Amhara Region, Ethiopia. This woreda is named after the traditional district it lies in, Dejen, which is best known as where Admas Mogasa, the widow of Emperor Menas, raised the future Emperor Susenyos and instructed him in "the doctrine of the holy books." Part of the Misraq Gojjam Zone, Dejen is bordered on the south by the Abay River which separates it from the Oromia Region, on the west by Awabel, on the northwest by Debay Telatgen, on the north by Enemay, and on the east by Shebel Berenta. The major town in Dejen is Dejen.

== Overview ==
Dejen is connected to Wara Jarso in Oromia by the Abay Bridge, which also carries the Addis Ababa-Bahir Dar highway. Before this bridge was erected, the Abay was crossed at the Shefartak ford (at 10° 5' N 38° 17' E). A new bridge, the Hidasie Bridge, was dedicated 10 September 2008 at the presence of senior government officials and other guests. Funded by the Japanese government at a cost of $14 million (approximately 135.5 million Birr), the Hidasie Bridge is 303 meters long and part of the new Addis Ababa-Dejen road. Experts foresee that improvements like the new bridge will allow drivers to double their speed to 60 kilometers per hour, and increase the volume of vehicles from the current 360 a day to 729 in six years. The new bridge sits alongside the older one over the Abay which had been built by the Italian government as part of their war reparations for their occupation of Ethiopia during World War II, and was about 60 years old when the new one was opened.

On 21 August 2008, residents of the town of Dejen gathered to protest the delay by local officials' over a decision on the residents' application for use of nearby farmland. Local police and militia surrounded the demonstrators, and beat dozens; a few protesters had injuries requiring hospitalization. No legal action was taken against the perpetrators.

== Demographics ==
A 2012 estimate puts the population at 111,544. This gives a population density of 179.63 people per square kilometer (465.24 people per square mile), given its area of 620.97 square kilometers (239.76 square miles), higher than the East Gojjam Zone average of 167.94 people per square kilometer (434.95 people per square mile).

Based on the 2007 national census conducted by the Central Statistical Agency of Ethiopia (CSA), this woreda has a total population of 102,359, an increase of 17.02% over the 1994 census, of whom 49,487 are men and 52,872 women; 8,700 or 8.50% are urban inhabitants. With an area of 620.97 square kilometers (239.76 square miles), Dejen has a population density of 164.84 people per square kilometer (426.93 people per square mile), which is greater than the Zone average of 153.8 persons per square kilometer (398.35 people per square mile). A total of 25,511 households were counted in this woreda, resulting in an average of 4.01 persons to a household, and 24,917 housing units.

The majority of the inhabitants practiced Ethiopian Orthodox Christianity, with 97.01% reporting that as their religion, while 2.85% of the population said they were Muslim.

The 1994 national census reported a total population for this woreda of 87,469 in 18,399 households, of whom 42,440 were men and 45,029 were women; 8,930 or 10.21% of its population were urban dwellers. The largest ethnic group reported in Dejen was the Amhara (99.87%). The majority of the inhabitants practiced Ethiopian Orthodox Christianity, with 94.83% reporting that as their religion, while 5.1% were Muslim.
