= Mota, Ethiopia =

Town in Amhara Region, Ethiopia

Mota
- Town
- Location in Ethiopia Mota (Africa)
- Coordinates: 11°5′N 37°52′E
- Country: Ethiopia
- Region: Amhara
- Zone: Misraq Gojjam
- Elevation: 2,487 m (8,159 ft)

Population (2007)
  - Total: 26,177
  - Estimate (2021): 56,156
- Time zone: UTC+3 (EAT)

Mota (Amharic: ሞጣ) is a town in northwest Ethiopia. It is located in the Misraq Gojjam Zone of the Amhara Region on the secondary road that links Dejen with Bahir Dar overlooking the Abay River. The town has a latitude and longitude of 11°5′N 37°52′E with an elevation of 2,487 meters above sea level.

One local landmark is Sebara Dildiy or "the Broken Bridge", a stone footbridge built during the reign of Emperor Fasilides in the mid 17th century. Another landmark is the church of Weyzazirt Kidhane Mihret, which was constructed by Woizero Seble Wengel, the daughter of Emperor Fasilides. She and her husband are buried there.

== History ==
=== 19th Century ===
Due to the presence of Sebara Dildiy, one of only two bridges across the Abay River until the late 19th century, Mota became a major commercial center. Described by at least one group of European travellers as "the most considerable market" in Gojjam; it attracted merchants from as far away as Begemder, Gondar and Tigray. To reinstate the commerce prior to the bridge being broken, an organization named Bridges to Prosperity is building a 100-meter suspended pedestrian bridge to provide safe access Those crossing the river are able to obtain cotton cloth, cattle, and horses. Likewise, Mota was the seat of an important royal fiefdom during the Gondarine period, and a notable place for asylum in the early 19th century.

The artist Aleqa Elyas Hailu, believed to be Ethiopia's first foreign-trained artist, was born in Mota around 1861. He worked mostly in Shewa where he decorated manuscripts and many churches, although he also decorated one in his native town. His son Aleqa Gebre Ezgziabher Elyas was a man of literature, writing the Royal Chronicle of Lij Iyasu and the Empress Zewditu.

=== 20th Century ===
During the 1930s, its market day was on Thursday. During the East African Campaign, units of Gideon Force managed to bluff the Italian garrison into surrendering 24 April 1941. After the war, Mota was the administrative center of the Mota awraja or district, which was one of the hotspots of the Gojjam peasant revolt in 1968.

=== 21st Century ===
In October 2009, zonal officials announced that construction of 47-km road connecting Mota and Digua Tsion had begun, with a budget of over 147 million Birr and completion expected by September 2010.

== Demographics ==
Based on figures from the Central Statistical Agency in 2007, this town has an estimated total population of 26,177 of whom 13,331 were male and 12,846 female. The 1994 census reported this town had a total population of 18,160 of whom 8,218 were male and 9,942 were female. It is the largest of three settlements in Hulet Ej Enese woreda.
