= Sebara Dildiy =

Ethiopian bridge

Sebara Dildiy ሰበረ ድልድይ (Amharic)
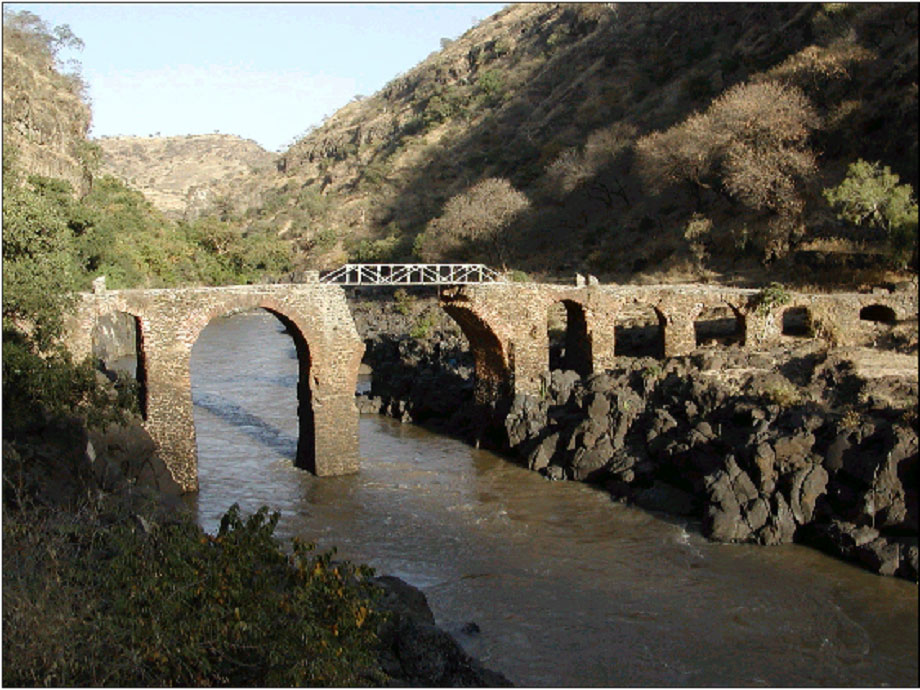
- A photograph of the Sebara Dildiy, with a truss bridge linking the partially destroyed arch section (2005)
- Coordinates: 11°13′04″N 37°52′36″E
- Carried: Footpath
- Crossed: Blue Nile (Abay River)
- Locale: Amhara Region, Ethiopia
- Other name(s): Portuguese Bridge, Fasil Bridge, Broken bridge

Characteristics
- Design: Arch bridge
- Material: Lime mortar and local stones
- Total length: 60 metres (200 ft)
- Width: 4 metres (13 ft)
- Traversable?: No
- No. of spans: 10 (arches)

History
- Built: between 1600–1660 (Gondarine period)
- Destroyed: Likely during World War II

Location
- Interactive map of Sebara Dildiy

Sebara Dildiy (Amharic: ሰበረ ድልድይ seberi dilidī, "Broken Bridge"), also commonly known as the Portuguese Bridge or the Fasil Bridge, is a 17th century arch bridge built during the Gondarine period, constructed across the Blue Nile, which is locally referred to as the Abay River in Ethiopia. It is located to the northeast of Mota in the Misraq Gojjam Zone of the Amhara Region. The bridge is 60 meters in length and 4 meters in width. The bridge was built during Emperor Fasilides reign by Portuguese descendants (for this reason is also known as the Portuguese Bridge) during the 17th century, likely between 1600–1660, and it is believed to have been partially destroyed during World War II.

It is reported that no significant repairs have been successful since its partial destruction, likely during World War II. In February 2002, a metal truss bridge, supported by the original superstructure, was installed to restore the functionality of Sebara Dildiy, making it traversable. It was designed and installed by an American nonprofit organization, Bridges to Prosperity, and it reportedly lasted until 2005. In 2009, a cable suspension bridge for pedestrians was built nearby to connect to the country's existing road network.

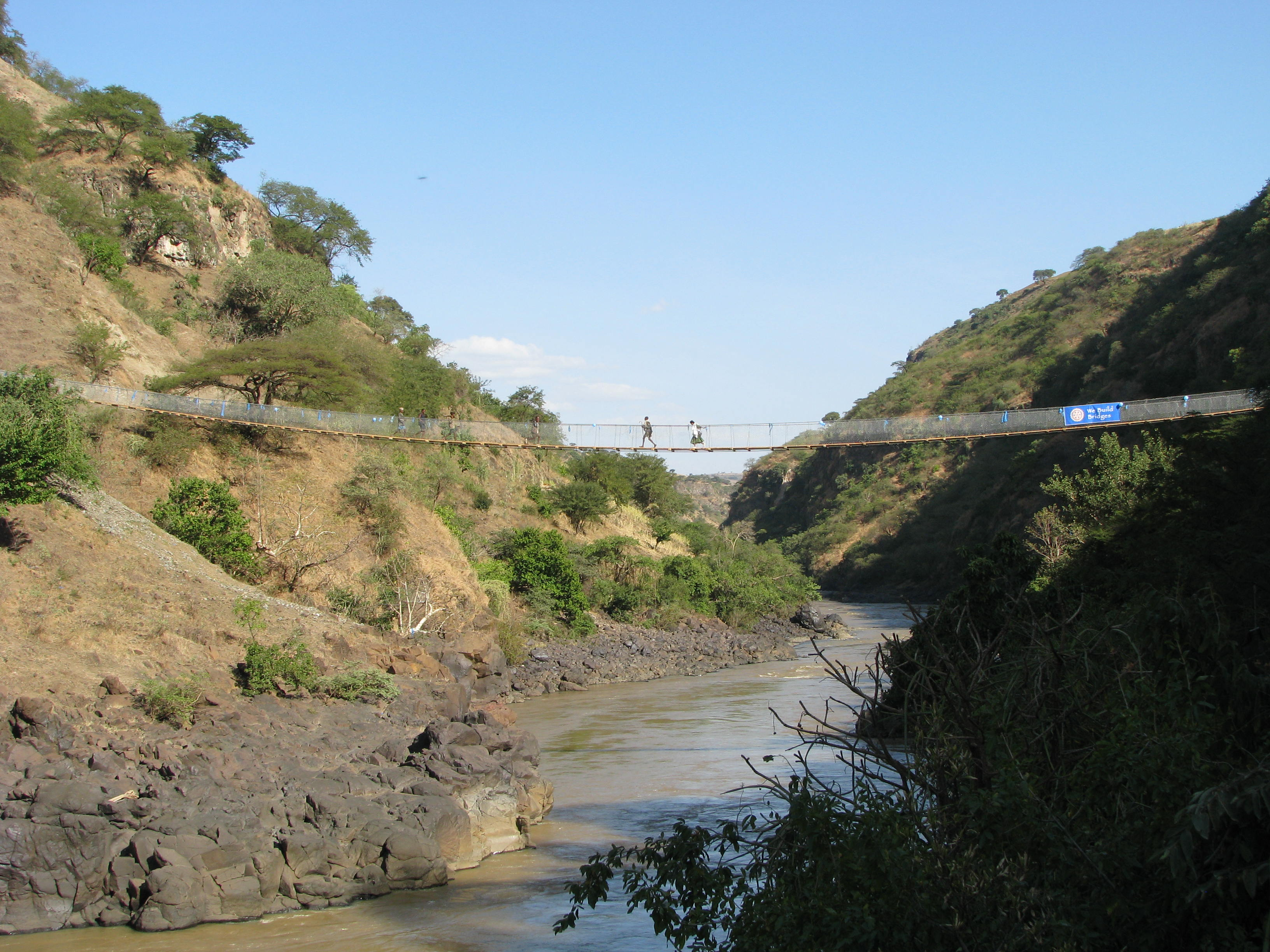
A cable suspension bridge constructed in 2009 to functionally replace Sebara Dildily

== Legendary foundation ==
According to Ethiopian legend, Emperor Fasilides was said to have been in possession of many beautiful concubines, but none dared to admonish him openly as the clergy wished to retain their privileges. An austere and religious monk, finding this to be unacceptable, made his way to the Emperor's palace in Gondar whereupon he openly condemned Fasilides. The furious Emperor then had the monk executed in the public square. Immediately after the execution, many of the clergymen claimed to have seen the victim's head with wings fly into heaven and decided to excommunicate the Emperor; they, too, were sentenced to death. The Emperor was said to have deeply regretted his actions, but could not find a monk to absolve him of his sins. Fasilides then learned in his dreams that a very holy elderly hermit, who never leaves her cave, existed in the mountains of Simien. Dressed as a pilgrim, Fasilides undertook the long journey to her refuge and begged her absolution. The old woman refused to pardon him and instead gave some advice, telling the monarch to return to Gondar and find a young slave woman who carries extra jugs for the poor.

Fasilides made his way back to Gondar, where he identified the slave and the hut she lived in. There, to her great surprise, the Emperor went in with humble clothes and knelt before her. He explained the reason for his arrival and begged her absolution. The slave was greatly confused at the sight of her Emperor bowing before her, saying, "Why O' Emperor do you thus humiliate yourself before me, your slave? Only the Almighty condemns and absolves, but if you please, listen to my advice: there where the road across the river is dangerous, build a bridge, and issue a decree that everyone who cross the bridge say 'God save the soul of Fasilides!' The Almighty will surely grant this prayer repeated by an entire people!" The Emperor followed the slave's advice and constructed the stone bridge across the Abay river in Gojjam. Italian scholar Alberto Pollera, while visiting the bridge in 1930, almost three centuries after it was built, claimed to have personally witnessed caravanners and merchants who, upon crossing the bridge, cried out, "God save the soul of Fasilides!"

== History ==
The introduction of lime mortar to Ethiopia is attributed to an artisan from India imported by the Portuguese in 1621, who, according to Manuel de Almeida, "discovered a kind of fine, light as it were worm eaten stone", similar to that used in the manufacture of lime in Gujarat. The value of this innovation was recognized, Almeida says, by both the Emperor and the local stonemasons, who "valued it greatly". The establishment of Gondar and the beginning of the Gondarine period would be accompanied by the building of a number of bridges, greatly facilitated by the introduction of lime mortar, as Ethiopian stonemasons regularly struggled in finding cement to make mortar. The innovation of bridge building was taken under the reign of Emperor Fasilides, who built seven stone bridges throughout his reign, the most notable one being the Sebara Dildiy.

Geographer C.T. Beke was told that the central arch of this bridge was removed during the Zemene Mesafint (1769–1855) by the orders of a local warlord to stop an impending invasion. Despite the damage, Beke reports that it was still used by native merchants, who "by means of ropes stretched across the open space, they manage to pass with their merchandise from one side to the other, without entering, the stream." In 1908, Emperor Menelik II ordered its reconstruction and also added an imposing gateway on the southern side of the bridge, which featured a cement panel commemorating his work.

The bridge was destroyed on April 29, 1941, by retreating Italian soldiers during the East African Campaign. In early April 1941, the Gideon Force attacked the Italian garrison at Bahir Dar, Colonel Saverio Maraventano and his garrison of 8,000 men were forced to retreat. After crossing the Abay River, they then demolished the stone bridge that served as a crossing. The destruction of the bridge was mentioned in Haile Selassie's (Emperor of Ethiopia from 1930 to 1974) autobiography:

The Italians had also destroyed the bridge over the Abay river and the debris in the water made it difficult for us to cross. Nevertheless, since we had surmounted the biggest difficulty, the destruction of the Abay bridge could in no way prevent us from continuing our journey.

— Haile Selassie's autobiography

No significant repairs were undertaken afterwards; temporary crossing was on wooden logs or by ropes. The lack of safety caused five deaths every year. The bridge was repaired in February 2002 by engineers from the American philanthropic organization Bridges to Prosperity. The repairs to the Sebara Dildiy bridge reportedly lasted until 2005. After this, a modern bridge that was connected to the country's road network was constructed nearby in 2009.
