= Awabel =

District in Amhara Region, Ethiopia

Coordinates: 10°30′N 37°45′E

- Woreda
- Flag
- Interactive map of Awabel
- Country: Ethiopia
- Region: Amhara
- Zone: Misraq Gojjam

Area
  - Total: 806.98 km^{2} (311.58 sq mi)

Population (2012 est.)
  - Total: 132,726
  - Density: 164.47/km^{2} (425.98/sq mi)

Awabel is a woreda in Amhara Region, Ethiopia. Part of the Misraq Gojjam Zone, Awabel is bordered on the south by the Abay River which separates it from the Oromia Region, on the west by Aneded, on the northwest by Sinan, on the northeast by Debay Telatgen, and on the east by Dejen. Towns in Awabel include Lumame and Wejel. The woreda of Aneded was separated from Awabel.

== Demographics ==
A 2012 estimate puts the population at 132,726. With an area of 806.98 square kilometers (311.58), Awabel has a population density of 164.47 people per square kilometer (425.98 people per square mile), which is only slightly less than the East Gojjam Zone average of 167.94 people per square kilometer (434.95 people per square mile).

Based on the 2007 national census conducted by the Central Statistical Agency of Ethiopia (CSA), this woreda has a total population of 121,588, of whom 60,226 are men and 61,362 women; 11,833 or 9.73% are urban inhabitants. A total of 28,487 households were counted in this woreda, resulting in an average of 4.27 persons to a household, and 27,610 housing units.

The majority of the inhabitants practiced Ethiopian Orthodox Christianity, with 95.36% reporting that as their religion, while 4.61% of the population said they were Muslim.

The 1994 national census reported a total population for this woreda of 142,830 in 30,139 households, of whom 71,177 were men and 71,653 were women; 8,725 or 6.11% of its population were urban dwellers. The largest ethnic group reported in Awabel was the Amhara (99.74%). The majority of the inhabitants practiced Ethiopian Orthodox Christianity, with 97.07% reporting that as their religion, while 2.73% were Muslim.
