= Sede, Ethiopia =

Sedie
- Location in Ethiopia
- Coordinates: 10°57′N 37°53′E
- Country: Ethiopia
- Region: Amhara
- Elevation: 2,555 m (8,383 ft)
- Time zone: UTC+3 (East Africa Time)

Sedie (also known as Sedie Giyorgis) is a town and woreda in west-central Ethiopia. Located in the Misraq Gojjam Zone of the Amhara Region, it has a latitude and longitude of 10°57′N 37°53′E and an elevation of 2555 meters above sea level.

The town was organized in the 1930s. Sedie woreda features four high school (in 2011 E.C), and 3 clinic (tena tabia).

Based on figures from the Central Statistical Agency in 2005, this town has an estimated total population of 2,309, of whom 1,013 are men and 1,296 are women. The 1994 national census reported a total population for Sede of 1,345 in 408 households, of whom 533 were men and 812 were women. The majority of the inhabitants practiced Ethiopian Orthodox Christianity, with 94.6% reporting that as their religion, while 5.4% were Muslim.
