= Bridges to Prosperity =

US-based non-profit organization

Fika (formerly Bridges to Prosperity)
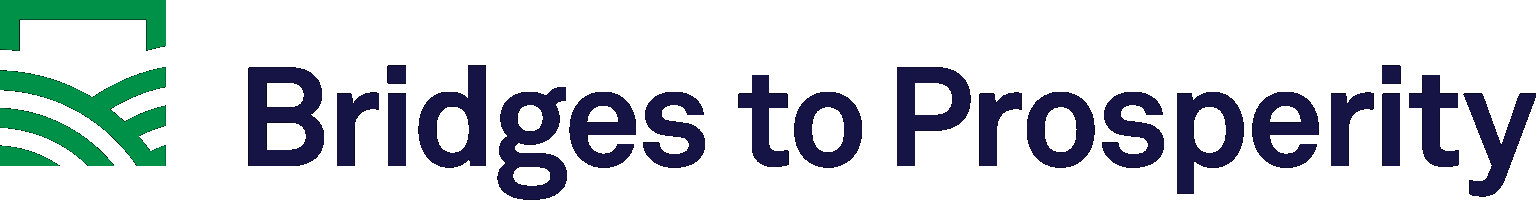
- Formation: 2001 (25 years ago)
- Founder: Kenneth Frantz
- Type: Social enterprise
- Purpose: Last mile connectivity
- Headquarters: 5500 Greenwood Plaza Blvd; Suite 130; Greenwood Village, CO 80111
- Method: Partner with local governments to connect rural last mile with access to health care, schools and markets.
- President & CEO: Nivi Sharma
- Key people: Ann Cannella (Chief Financial Officer), Abbie Noriega (Chief Impact Officer), Alex McNeill (VP of Advisory Services), Alissa Smith (VP of Business Development), Eng. Rwunguko Jean D'Amour (East Africa Operations Director), Alan McGrane (Director of Engineering), Carolyn Ogott (Director of Talent), Delphine Mugisha (Uganda Country Director), Eniola Mafe Abaga (Global Advocacy and Partnership Director), Erica Brandt (Director of Strategic Partnerships), Ermiyas Ketema (Regional Engineering Manager), Jeff Murenzi (Rwanda Program Director), Linda Bihire (Strategic Partnerships Specialist), Pauline Uwamariya (Rwanda Operations Manager)
- Revenue: US$15 million (FY 2021–22)
- Staff: 110 (international)
- Website: bridgestoprosperity.org

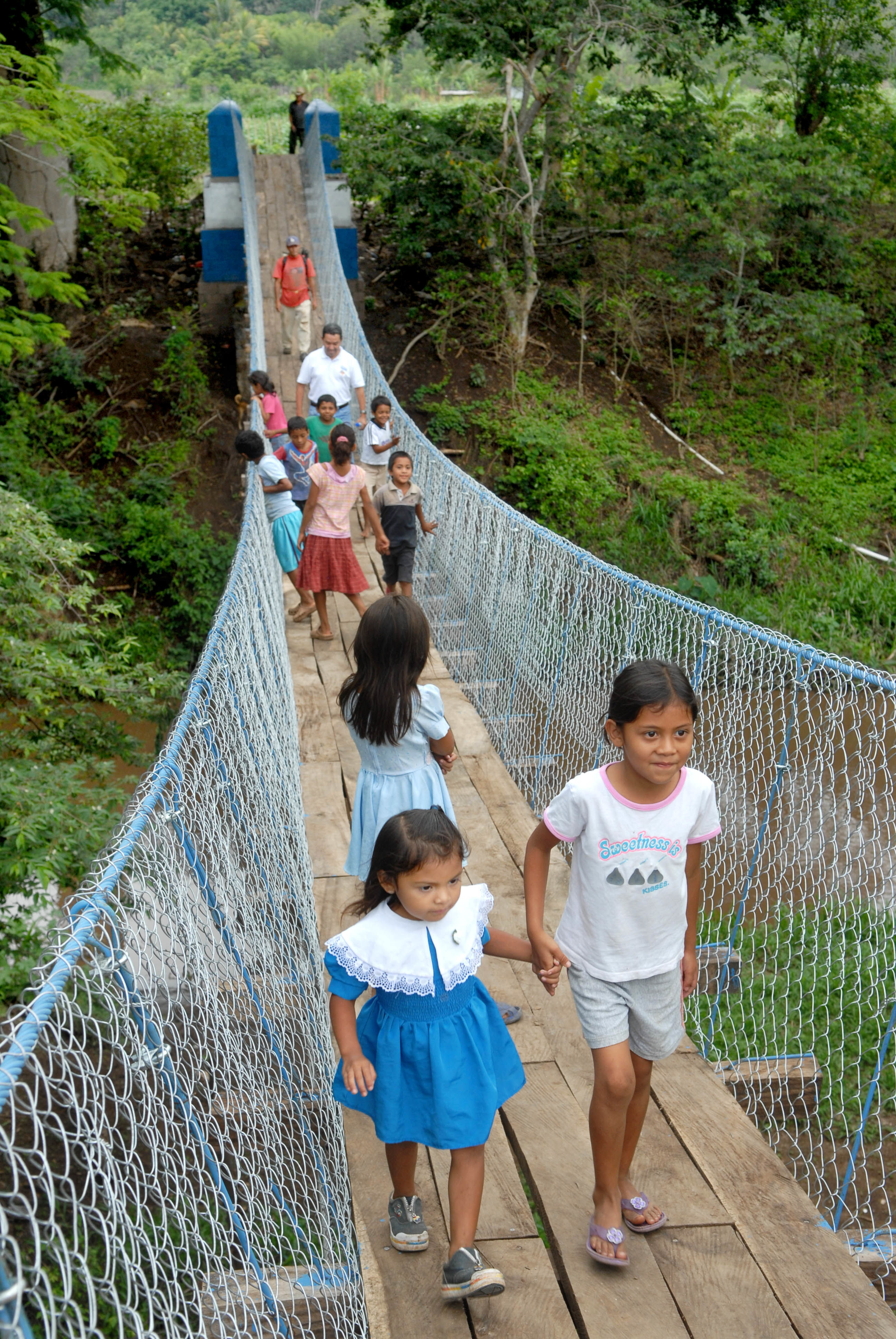
Children crossing a new trailbridge built with Fika in El Salvador

Fika (formerly Bridges to Prosperity “B2P”) is a United States–based nonprofit organization that partners with local governments to connect communities via pedestrian trailbridges, in addition to providing technical assistance and resource mobilization. Fika is based in Denver, Colorado, with an operational headquarters in Rwanda and staff around the world.

Trailbridges are cost-effective, durable, and safe, as well as easy for rural communities to build with only modest support, while the impact is great. A randomized control study completed at the University of Notre Dame concluded that bridge connectivity increases farm profits by 75%, labor market income by 36%, and overall household income 30%.

Since its foundation, over 450 bridges have been built, connecting over 1.5 million people across 21 countries.

Fika’s current efforts are centered in East Africa due to a compelling mix of need (with millions living in rural isolation due to impassable rivers), existing interest from national governments to invest, the region's track record of safety and stability of leadership, and Fika’s long-standing relationships in the region.

In 2019, Fika partnered with the government of Rwanda in the organization's first scaled program to build over 200 trail bridges between 2019 and 2024, serving over 660,000 people. A similar program was started in Uganda in 2018 to test a country-wide coalition approach to bridge building. Finally, in 2021, The Leona M. and Harry B. Helmsley Charitable Trust provided a $10.7 million 3-year partnership between Helvetas, Fika, and the Government of Ethiopia to construct 150 bridges between 2022 and 2025, serving over 1.3 million people in that time frame.

== Mission ==
Fika says it uses a community-driven approach and technology to deliver benefits to communities worldwide. It states that its trailbridges are intended to improve access to opportunity, extend the reach of other development programs, and reduce poverty caused by rural isolation.

== History ==
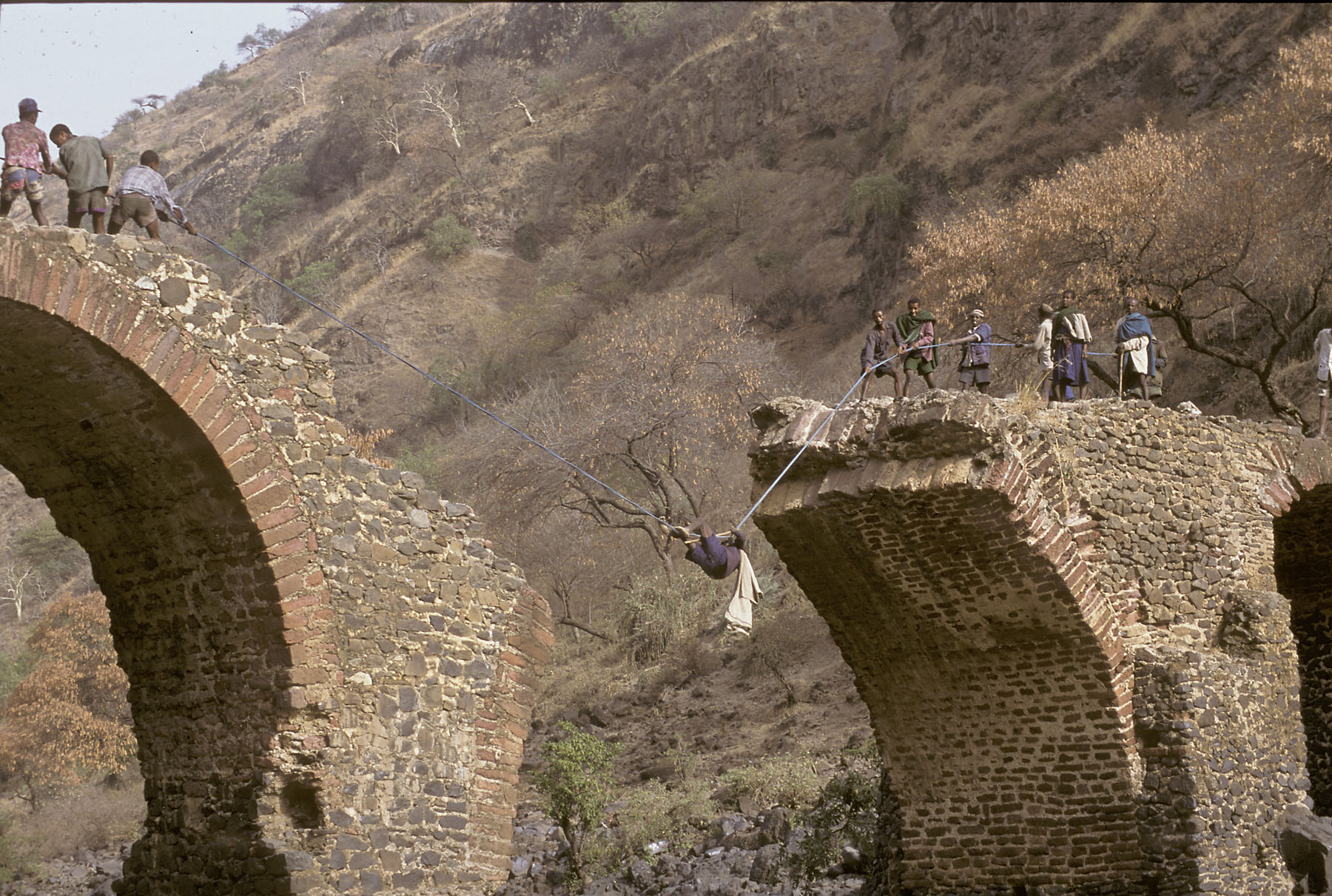
Men pull each other across the Blue Nile River by rope prior to Fika building a new bridge.

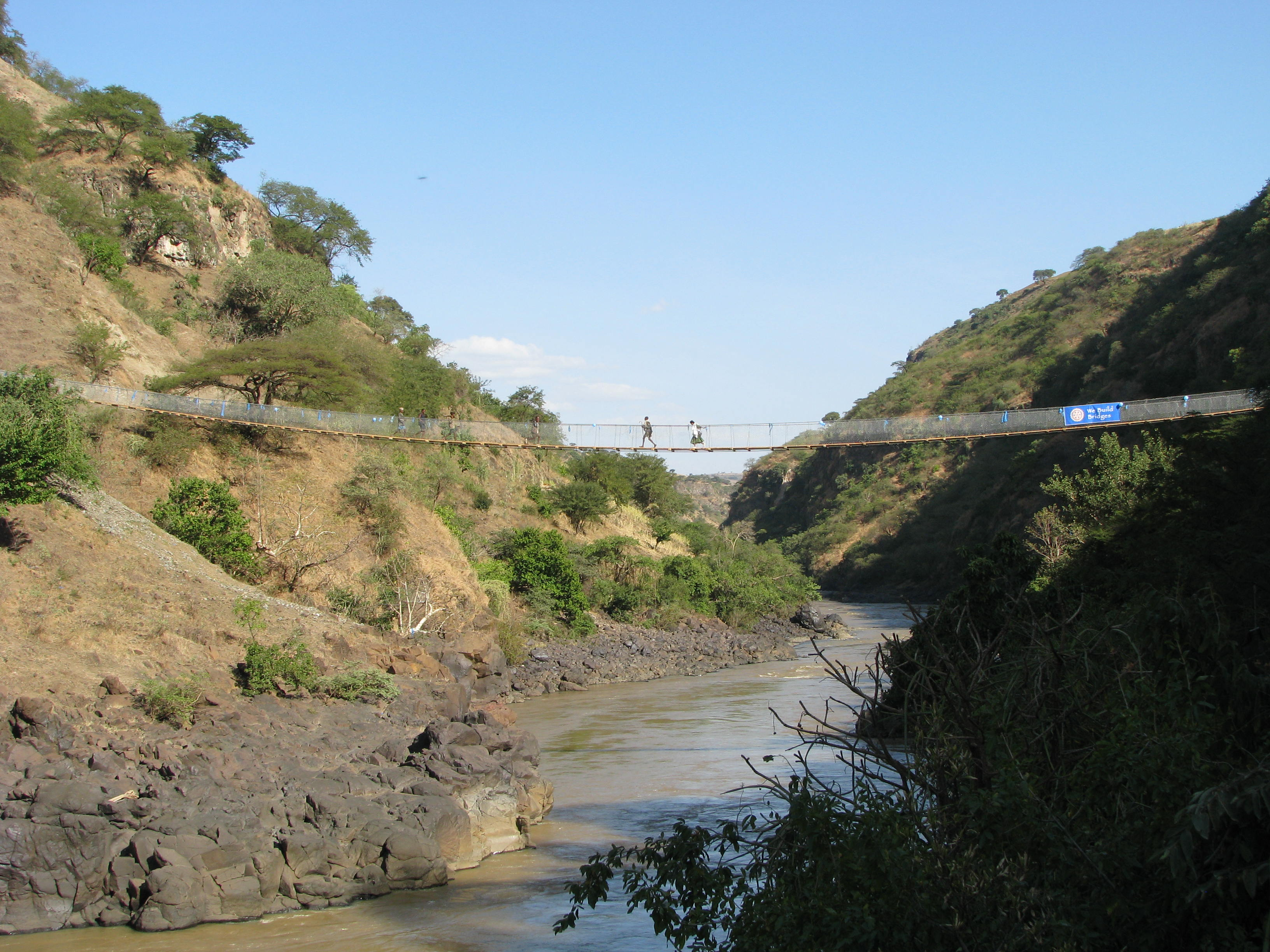
New Blue Nile River suspended bridge completed in 2009 serves over 10,000 rural Ethiopians.

Fika was established by Kenneth Frantz in 2001, after seeing a photo in National Geographic Magazine of a broken bridge over the Blue Nile River in Ethiopia, with ten men on either side of the broken span pulling themselves across the chasm by rope.

Transport is a crucial driver of development, bringing socio-economic opportunities within the reach of the poor and enabling economies to be more competitive. Transport infrastructure connects people to jobs, education, and health services; it enables the supply of goods and services around the world; and it allows people to interact and generate the knowledge that creates long-term growth. Rural roads, for example, can help prevent maternal deaths through timely access to childbirth-related care, boost girls' enrollment in school, and increase and diversify farmers' income by connecting them to markets.

The World Bank estimates that over 1 billion people do not have access to transportation networks. Bridges to Prosperity determined that positive results could be attained by spreading the technology by building approximately 10–20 demonstration bridges per country, training locals, partnering with local technological institutes, providing downloadable and easy to use step-by-step photo and video manuals, and supplying free wire rope and wire rope clamps/clips for post-training/demonstration programs. Fika has focused on education and training, the propagation of technical manuals, and trail bridge building textbooks as components of trail bridge building best practices.

All Fika trailbridges leverage locally sourced and repurposed materials. Materials are not donated where that would cause unintended harm to existing businesses. In 2005, Fika received a long term donation of free 7/8 inch to 1.25 inch wire rope from the ports of Portsmouth and Norfolk, Virginia. The wire rope donated was American manufactured high tensile steel wire rope used on gantry cranes for unloading container ships. Later, the port of Baltimore was added, as were Texas and West Coast ports. In 2012, approximately 100,000 feet of such donated used wire rope and strand was shipped in an intermodal container to programs all over the world. To build one trailbridge, the average number of feet of wire rope required is approximately 1,800 feet. Worldwide, there is enough recycled wire rope from gantry cranes to build approximately 2,500 footbridges every year. Each container shipped overseas weighs approximately 52,000 pounds and contains 20,000 feet of cable.

Charity Navigator rated Fika their top rating, four stars.

== Strategy ==
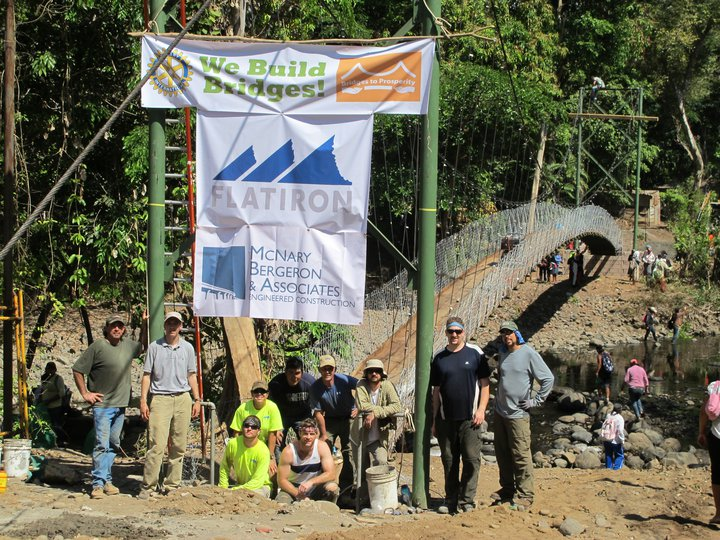
Team members celebrate completion of Bosque, El Salvador bridge.

Safe access is transformative for households, communities, and countries. Fika partners with local governments and community leaders to develop, enable, and advocate for national infrastructure programs that acknowledge the needs of rural populations.

To help effect this system change approach, Fika is furthering the following three initiatives as outlined in the organization's strategic plan: 1) gather the evidence supporting efficacy and efficiency of safe access as a fulcrum for rural development; 2) create collective action to elevate rural transport on the development agenda; and 3) support governments with technical assistance best practices and the capacity to make smart infrastructure investments.

== Awards ==
Fika has been recognized by a number of global awards. In 2016, Bridges to Prosperity was named the 2016 Eurostar Ashden Award for Sustainability, and one of the top 10 Social Enterprises in the world by Classy.

== Corporate sponsorship ==
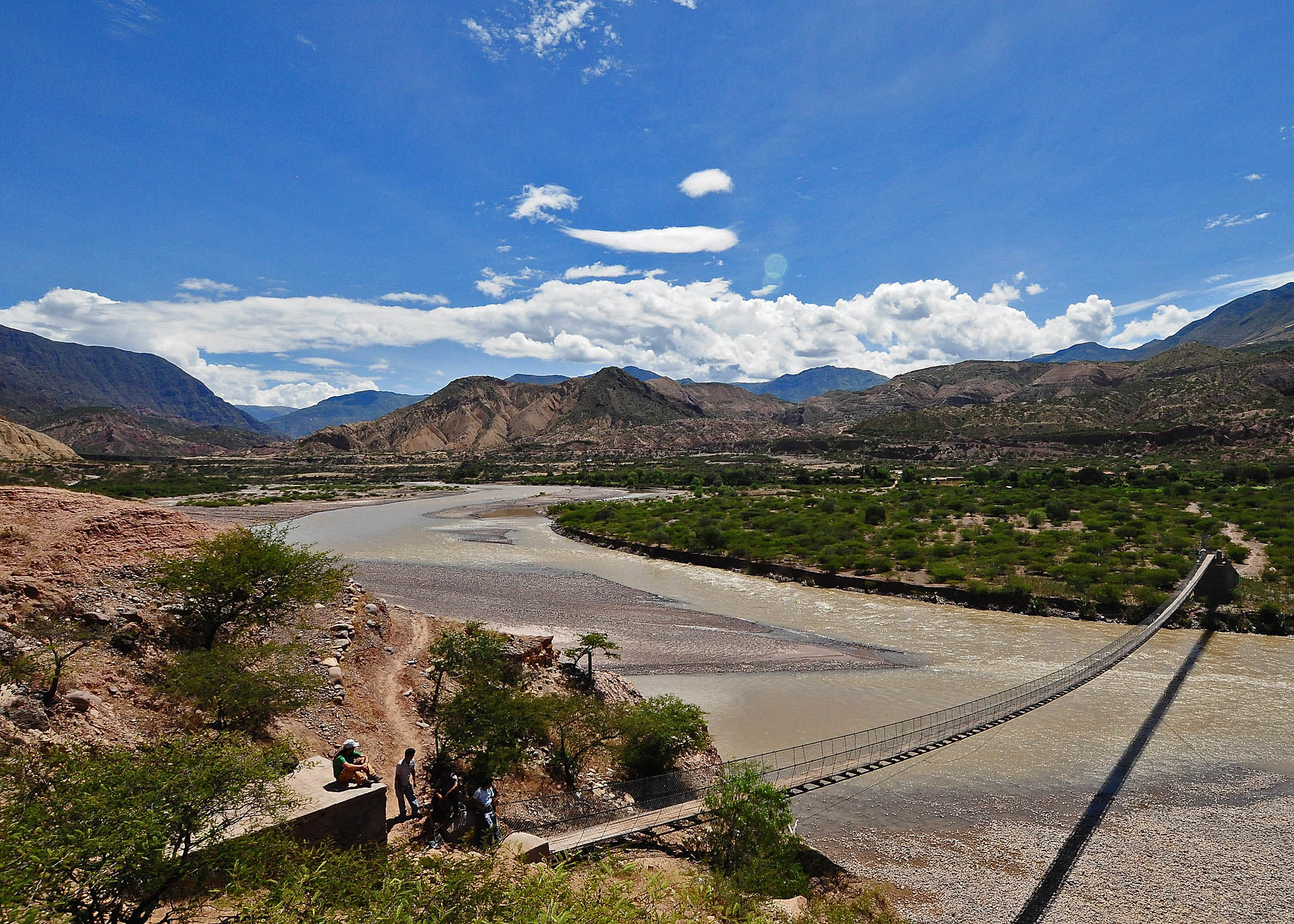
Fika footbridge in Chaypara, central Peru

Fika has a corporate sponsor program in which company employees form teams to design and build trailbridges. The program began with construction firms, especially those that design and build highway bridges, and has since included companies ranging from financial services firms to construction companies around the world.

The original industry partners included Ross Construction of Palo Alto, California, and Flatiron Construction, along with Flatiron's parent company, Hochtief of Germany. By 2019 over 50 industry partners included Parsons Corporation, COWI, Alridge, Berger Charitable Foundation, Balfour Beatty, Europengineers, Institution of Civil Engineers, Kiewit, Michael Baker, NSBA, Railroad Construction Co, Thornton Tomasetti, WSP, American Bridge, Arup, Bechtel, Burohappold, FHECOR, HDR, Freyssinet, IBT, Knights Brown, KPFF, McNary Bergeron, Mott MacDonald, PCL, Price & Myers, Ramboll Fonden, Tony Gee, Traylor Bros, Walsh, and Weston & Sampson.

== Rotary ==
Important supporters include various Rotary International clubs who collaborate in providing Rotary Foundation-matched humanitarian grants.

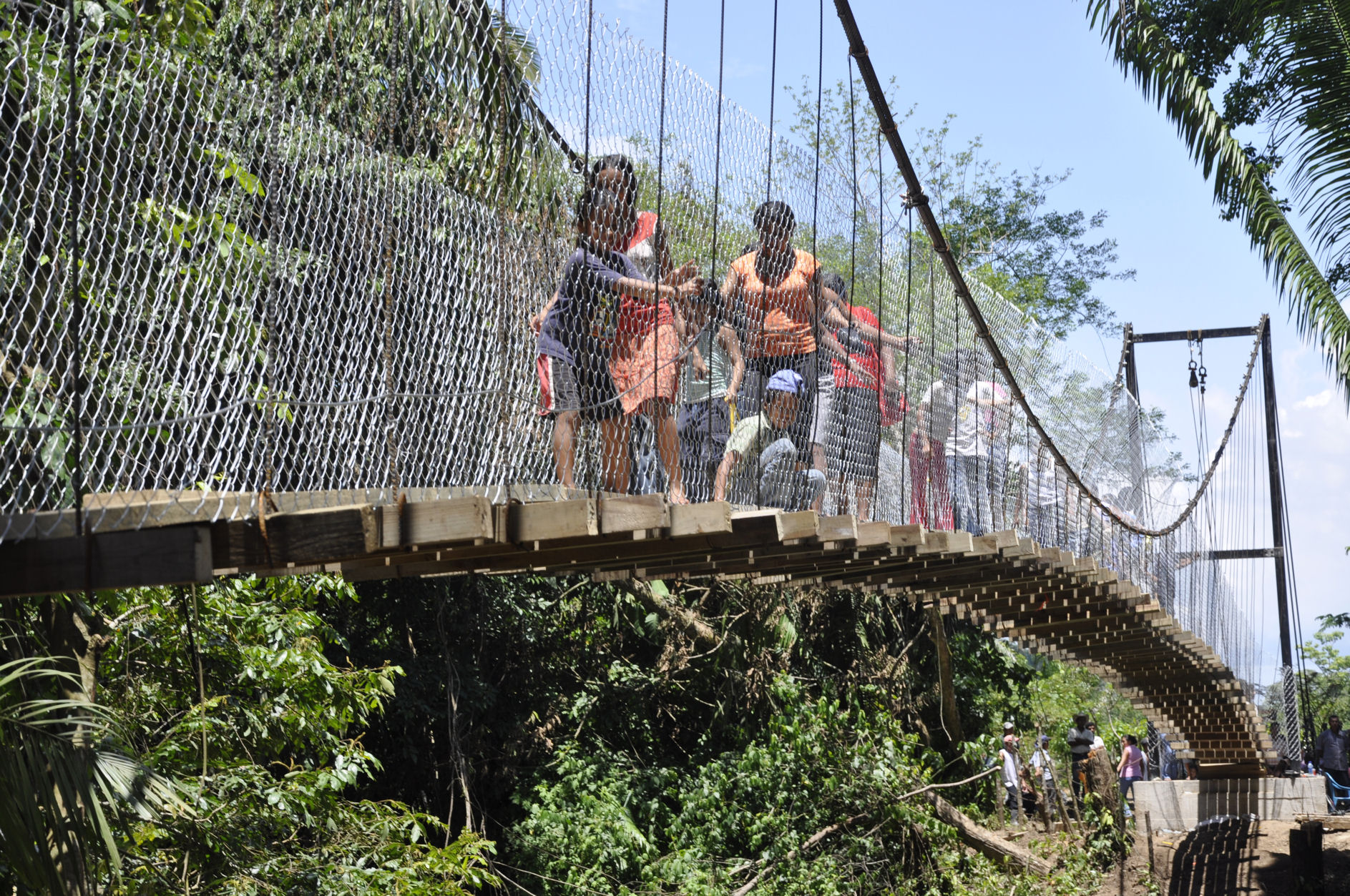
University of Iowa (Continental Crossing) engineering school footbridge in Honduras

When Fika was founded by a member of the Gloucester Point Rotary Club in Gloucester, Virginia. That club assisted in the purchase of materials for the repair of the Blue Nile Bridge. Over 65 Rotary clubs worldwide (and over 800 individual Rotarians) have participated directly in Fika programs.

Partnerships with the local developing country Rotary clubs, such as the Rotary Club of Nkwazi, Lusaka, Zambia, facilitate access and operation in countries with little bureaucratic interference. The partnerships with local Rotary clubs allow quick customs clearance of wire rope imports and expedited business contacts and allow USA-based Rotarians to easily travel and participate in schemes as well as adding defense against potential corruption.

== University programs ==
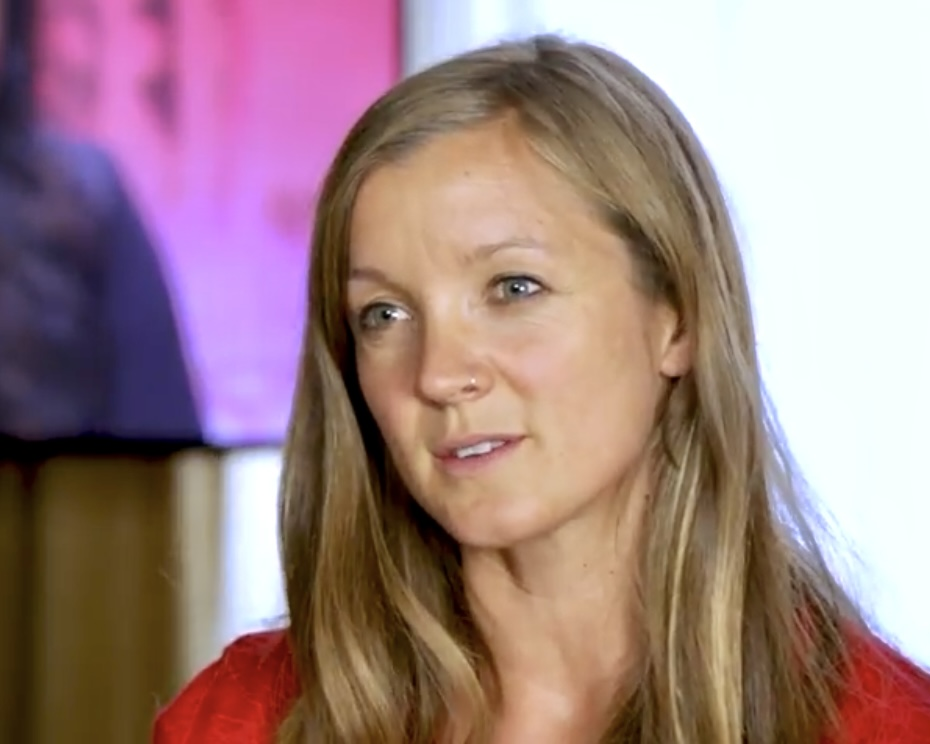
Former CEO Avery Bang in 2018

Support from former CEO Avery Bang's alma mater, the University of Iowa engineering school, and non-profit Continental Crossings has led the construction of three additional bridges.

Other university engineering programs include Arizona State University, NDSEED, and Virginia Tech, among others. Effective September 1, 2018, the university program was spun off into its own entity with Engineers in Action.

== Financial information ==
In the fiscal year ending in 2022, the organization had revenues of $15,325,708 contributed as follows:

- Individual and grant contribution: 76%
- Corporate partnership fees: 9%
- Government contribution: 9%
- In-kind contribution & others: 6%
