= Bibugn =

District in Amhara Region, Ethiopia

Coordinates: 11°00′N 37°35′E

Bibugn ቢቡኝ
- Woreda
- Flag
- Interactive map of Bibugn
- Zone: Misraq Gojjam
- Region: Amhara

Area
  - Total: 399.79 km^{2} (154.36 sq mi)

Population (2012 est.)
  - Total: 89,250
  - Density: 223.24/km^{2} (578.19/sq mi)

Bibugn (Amharic: ቢቡኝ) is one of the woredas in the Amhara Region of Ethiopia. Part of the Misraq Gojjam Zone, Bibugn is bordered on the south by Sinan, on the west by Dega Damot woreda in the Mirab Gojjam Zone, on the northwest by Goncha, and on the east by Hulet Ej Enese. Towns in Bibugn include Digua Tsion, Weyin Wuha and Wabirr. Digo tsion (ድጎፅዮን) is the center of Bibugn wereda. There are over 15 kebelles in Bibugn wereda; among those, Debiresina is one of a kebelle that found in the north part.

== History ==
In 2003 the opposition All Ethiopian Unity Party (AEUP) attempted to open a branch office in Bibugn. On 7 February, AEUP informed woreda officials of its plan and provided them a list of names of AEUP organizers, as requested. After receiving the list, woreda officials announced over a megaphone that people should neither associate with AEUP nor rent a house to AEUP members for its branch office. On 10 November of the same year, local kebele officials and militia set the home of an AEUP member on fire while he was asleep with his wife and child. While they were able to escape, they lost their house, livestock, and food.

In October 2009, zonal officials announced that construction of 47-km road connecting Digua Tsion with Mota, with a budget of over 147 million Birr had begun, with completion expected by September 2010. The construction completed in 2005 E.C that connected Bibugne with Motta and Bahirdar towns. The construction road creates good opportunities for travelers from Debremaekos to Motta towns in a short way.

== Demographics ==
A 2012 estimate puts the population at 89,250. This gives a population density of 223.24 people per square kilometer (578.19 people per square mile), given its area of 399.79 square kilometers (154.36 square miles), higher than the East Gojjam Zone average of 167.94 people per square kilometer (434.95 people per square mile).

Based on the 2007 national census conducted by the Central Statistical Agency of Ethiopia (CSA), this woreda has a total population of 82,002, an increase of -1.48% over the 1994 census, of whom 40,190 are men and 41,812 women; 6,241 or 7.61% are urban inhabitants. A total of 18,548 households were counted in this woreda, resulting in an average of 4.42 persons to a household, and 17,959 housing units.

The majority of the inhabitants practiced Ethiopian Orthodox Christianity, with 99.13% reporting that as their religion.

The 1994 national census reported a total population for this woreda of 83,231 in 17,448 households, of whom 41,345 were men and 41,886 were women; 1,763 or 2.12% of its population were urban dwellers. The largest ethnic group reported in Bibugn was the Amhara (99.9%). The majority of the inhabitants practiced Ethiopian Orthodox Christianity, with 99.56% reporting that as their religion.
