= Amanuel =

Amanuel is a given name or a surname.

Notable people with the given name include:

- Amanuel Gebremichael (born 1999), Ethiopian footballer
- Amanuel Gebrezgabihier (born 1994), Eritrean cyclist
- Amanuel Melles (born 1993), Eritrean academic based in Canada
- Amanuel Mesel (born 1990), Eritrean long-distance runner

Notable people with the surname include:

- Meron Amanuel (born 1990), Eritrean cyclist
