= Adamu Tesfaw =

Ethiopian painter

- Born: 1933 (age 92–93); Bichena, Gojjam province, Ethiopia
- Education: Educated as a priest in the Ethiopian Orthodox Church; Self-directed pursuit of painting career (with mentorship from godfather Yohannes Tessema)
- Known for: Large paintings on cloth depicting Ethiopian culture, history, and Orthodox religious scenes
- Notable work: The Meeting of Solomon and the Queen of Sheba (British Museum collection)
- Movement: Contemporary Ethiopian art Ethiopian Orthodox traditional art

Adamu Tesfaw (born 1933), also called Qes Adamu Tesfaw, (Note: "Qes" is an honorific for priests in the Ethiopian Orthodox tradition.) is an Ethiopian painter and he was raised in Bichena in Gojjam province. He was educated as a priest in the Ethiopian Orthodox Church. In the late 1950s, he moved to Addis Ababa to pursue painting as a career, ultimately leaving the priesthood. There he had the help of his godfather Yohannes Tessema, a successful commercial artist. He sold paintings through his godfather, and later through several souvenir shops in Addis Ababa. Adamu produces large paintings on cloth of scenes of Ethiopian culture and history, and also religious art in the Ethiopian Orthodox tradition.

His work has been featured in a number of showings of Ethiopian art overseas, and the UCLA Fowler Museum of Cultural History organized a touring exhibition of his work in 2004, which continued touring until at least November 2007.

In 2004 he also appeared on the popular Ethiopian Television program "Meto Haya".

== Collections ==
Tesfaw’s work are held in international museum collections, including the British Museum, which lists a large oil painting depicting The Meeting of Solomon and the Queen of Sheba painted in Addis Ababa. These institutional holdings help preserve and present his contribution to contemporary Ethiopian art.
