= Bichena =

Town in Amhara Region, Ethiopia

- Town
- Location in Ethiopia
- Coordinates: 10°27′N 38°12′E
- Country: Ethiopia
- Region: Amhara
- Zone: Müştaq Gojjam
- Elevation: 2,541 m (8,337 ft)

Population (2005)
  - Total: 21,824 (est)
- Time zone: UTC+3 (EAT)

Bichena (Amharic: ብቸና) is a town in northern Ethiopia. Located in the Misraq Gojjam Zone of the Amhara Region on the hillside overlooking the Abay River, it has a latitude and longitude of 10°27′N 38°12′E and an elevation of 2541 meters above sea level. It is the administrative center of Enemay woreda.

== History ==
Bichena was important in the 18th century as the capital of the province of Gojjam; C.T. Beke, who visited the town in November 1841, reports that the town "which is pleasantly situated on a low eminence" was surrounded by "strong stone walls" and most of the houses were of stone too; however

all is now fallen into great decay, the walls being broken down, and the present houses being merely hovels of wattles covered with mud. In its time of greatness, it was the capital of Ras Hailu (Dejasmach Goshu's maternal grandfather), whose residence, a little way out of the town, was pointed out to me.

Paul B. Henze notes the nearby church of Weyname Kidane Mihret, which he found in the 1970s in a ruinous state, but the interior "was covered with extraordinary eighteenth-century paintings", although roughly a third were damaged beyond repair. Henze continues,

All the classic themes were there: the Flight into Egypt, Christ as a boy descending a sunbeam, Adam and Eve, Abraham sacrificing Isaac. There was an outstanding St George and dragon, a vivid depiction of the cannibal who was saved. The details -- were from traditional Ethiopian country life as it is still being lived in the surrounding area. The main (western) door of the maqdas had a garland of heads of angels as fine as any I had ever seen and there were several portraits of standing saints of exceptional quality and individuality.

According to the locals, the church had lost the lands it depended on during the governorship of Ras Hailu Tekle Haymanot, and afterwards suffered from neglect. This may be the same church that L.A. Fuertes mentions seeing in 1936.

Bichena was the scene of a massacre by the Derg in August 1975, when a delegation visited to explain the meaning of land reform. One of the meetings became unruly and nervous soldiers opened fire into the crowd; "later artillery and planes were summoned to quell what the government feared would be a major disturbance. Reports of the death toll vary from one hundred to one thousand."

On 12 October 2003, following a large public meeting of the All Ethiopian Unity Party, government militia accosted party leaders Kassa Zewdu and Sinishaw Tegegn, beat them, and confined them in Bichena jail.

== Demographics ==
Based on figures from the Central Statistical Agency in 2005, Bichena has an estimated total population of 21,824, of whom 10,824 are men and 10,833 are women. The 1994 census reported this town had a total population of 12,484 of whom 5,695 were men and 6,789 were women.

== Notable residents ==
- Adamu Tesfaw, painter
- Etege Seblewengel, Queen
- Etege Naod Mogessa, Queen
- Dejach Belay Zeleke, Patriot
- Shiferaw Gerbaw, Patriot
- Talaku Rass Haylu, Governor
- Colonel Atinafu Abate, Governor
- Awgchew Terefe, Writer
