= Balfour Beatty Infrastructure, Inc. =

- Type: Subsidiary
- Founded: 1990; 36 years ago
- Founder: Balfour Beatty plc
- Headquarters: Atlanta, Georgia
- Key people: John Rempe (President and CEO)
- Number of employees: 1,900 (2014)
- Parent: Balfour Beatty
- Website: www.balfourbeattyus.com

Balfour Beatty Infrastructure, Inc. is a heavy civil contractor operating in the United States. Established in North America in 1990, the company constructs highways, bridges, tunnels, wastewater and potable water treatment plants. Its parent company is Balfour Beatty.
