= Amanuel Melles =

Canadian community organizer

Amanuel Melles is a Canadian community organizer, a scientist and the current Executive Director of the Network for the Advancement of Black Communities.

Melles emigrated to Canada in 1993 from Eritrea. He worked for more than 10 years in the field of marine sciences and research, and in his home country, he headed the department of Marine Biology & Fisheries at the University of Asmara. As a certified underwater research diver, Amanuel studied and conducted research in Kenya, Mauritius, Saudi Arabia, Germany, the Netherlands, Belgium and Italy.

He won a 2001 New Pioneer Award for immigrants who have achieved success after overcoming barriers in their adoptive country. In 2002 he won a Jane Jacobs Prize, awarded to "unsung heroes" who have made Toronto a better place to live.

Amanuel Melles has been the Director of the Capacity Building Unit at United Way Toronto (UWT). He worked as the Manager for Community Action Unit at Family Service Toronto, Resource Development/Project Administrative Coordinator for the Ontario Council of Agencies Serving Immigrants, Director of Community Health Promotion Programs at New Heights Community Health Centre and as Principal of Aman Consulting.

He is a past member of the Toronto Region Immigrant Employment Council, past Board member of the Ontario Council for International Cooperation, Distress Centres Toronto, and past vice-president of the Community Social Planning Council of Toronto. Amanuel was the founding president of the African Canadian Social Development Council. He was the founding member of the Eritrean Canadian Society for Youth Advancement, mobilizing the community and providing leadership in public relations, project planning and implementation. He motivated volunteers to address stress and suicide prevention in the Eritrean Canadian community and co-founded the Canadians for Peace & Development in Eritrea (CPDE), an organization advocating peace and respect for human rights in the context of war between Eritrea and Ethiopia.

Amanuel co-chaired the Toronto Civic Panel of the Inclusive Cities Canada national initiative. He is an alumnus of the Maytree Foundation Leaders for Change and the Maytree-York University Management Programs. He is a trainer and educator in various areas related to the non-profit sector.
