= Mount Choqa =

Mountain in Ethiopia

- Mount Birhan
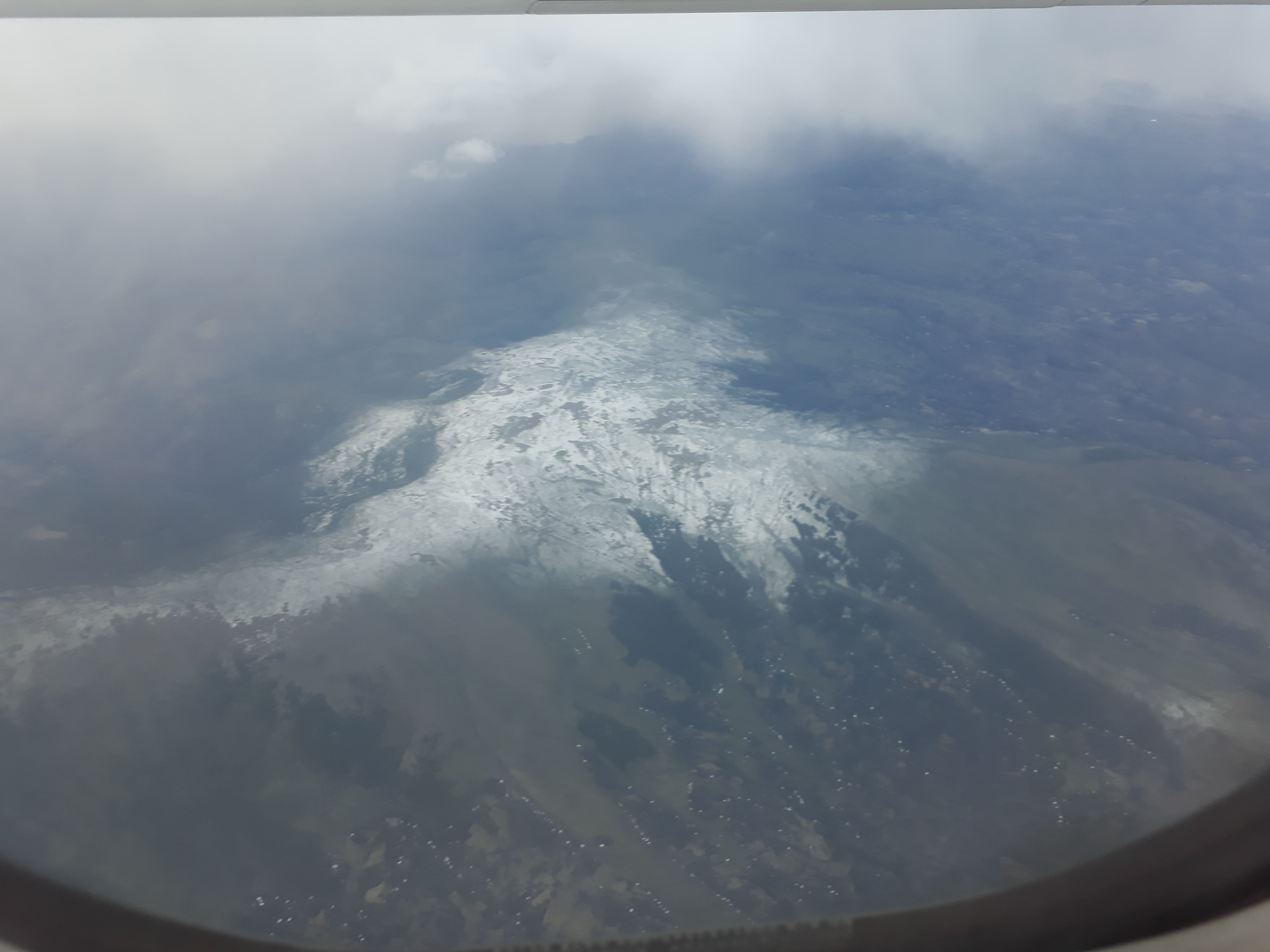
- In spring, Chokwe's peak is sometimes covered with snow

Highest point
- Elevation: 4,100 m (13,500 ft)
- Prominence: 2,225 m (7,300 ft)
- Listing: Ultra
- Coordinates: 10°42′48″N 37°50′54″E

Geography
- Location within Ethiopia
- Location: Amhara Region, Ethiopia

Mount Choqa (also known as ጮቄ ተራራ (in Ge'ez) Ch'ok'e Terara and Mount Birhan) at 4,100 metres (13,451 ft), is one of the highest mountains of Debay Telategn Gojjam, a region of Ethiopia located south of Lake Tana. The mountain and its surrounding area lacks forests, and its slopes are cultivated up to an elevation of 3,000 meters above sea level.

== Fauna and flora ==
=== Animals ===
Mount Choqa consists of large amount of mammals . Some of the mammals are Leopard (Panthera pardus), colobus monkey .

=== Vegetation ===
The most widely spread plant species found in Mount Choqa are the Juniperus procera, Erica arborea, Hagenia abyssinica, Hypericum revolutum and Olea europae. Dominant crops in the area include wheat and potato .

== See also ==
- List of Ultras of Africa
