= Dejen =

Town in Amhara Region, Ethiopia

- Town
- Location in Ethiopia
- Coordinates: 10°10′N 38°8′E
- Country: Ethiopia
- Region: Amhara
- Zone: Misraq Gojjam
- Elevation: 2,450 m (8,040 ft)

Population (2005)
  - Total: 15,483 (est)
- Time zone: UTC+3 (EAT)

Dejen (also transliterated Dajen) is a town in west-central Ethiopia. Located in the Misraq Gojjam Zone of the Amhara Region on the edge of the canyon of the Abay, it has a latitude and longitude of 10°10′N 38°8′E and an elevation between 2421 and 2490 meters above sea level. It is the administrative center of Dejen woreda.

Between 1954 and 1967, the town acquired telephone service. Dejen is a checkpoint for traffic crossing regional boundaries. Because of the enforced waiting time, there are several restaurants and hotels catering to waiting travellers. The Ethiopian Roads Authority announced 22 July 2009 that it had paved the 41 kilometers of road between Dejan and Gohatsion in Wara Jarso.

In August 2008, the Derba MIDROC Company opened a small cement factory Dashin cement factory on the outskirts of the town, which produces 4,000 qtls of cement per day. Some of the output of this factory will be used in the construction of the larger Derba Midroc Cement Factory, which will be located 70 kilometers north of Addis Ababa and is expected to be the largest cement factory in Ethiopia. North Holdings Investment announced 17 October 2009 that it had completed a feasibility study for its own cement factory at Dejen, which would be built on 450 hectares of land. Construction of the factory will cost around US$1.6 billion, and once completed it would have a production capacity of nine million tons a year.

== History ==
Dejen is named after the traditional district it lies in, Dejen, which is best known as where Admas Mogasa, the widow of Emperor Menas, raised the future Emperor Susenyos and instructed him in "the doctrine of the holy books."

P. H. G. Powell-Cotton, who camped there in March 1900, described Dejen as "a little village of a dozen huts or so perched on the steep side of the valley of the Mogga, and only remarkable as being the first village on the Gojam side" of the Abay.

The town was subjected to long-distance shelling on 16 April 1991, after its capture by the Ethiopian People's Revolutionary Democratic Front, and six people were killed.

By the end of August 2021, an internal note of the EU delegation in Ethiopia mentioned that the Oromo Liberation Army had established itself around the Blue Nile gorge, with a check point on the main road between Addis Ababa and Bahir Dar near the bridge at Dejen.

== Demographics ==
Based on figures from the Central Statistical Agency in 2005, Dejen has an estimated total population of 15,483, of whom 7,688 are men and 7,795 are women. The 1994 census reported this town had a total population of 8,930 of whom 4,045 were men and 4,885 were women.
