= Debre Markos =

City in Amhara Region, Ethiopia

Debre Markos ደብረ ማርቆስ
- City
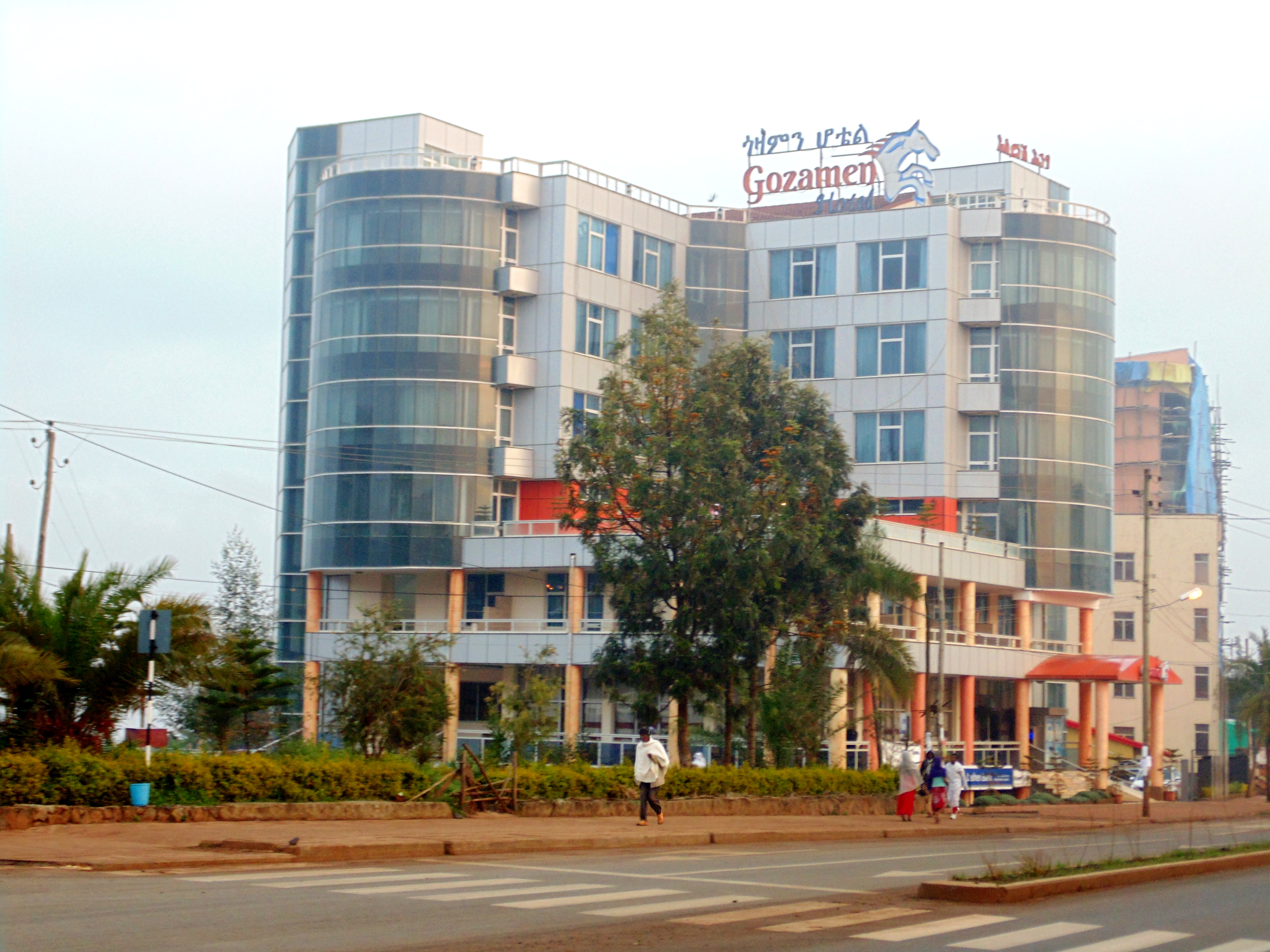
- A street in Debre Markos

- Location in Ethiopia
- Coordinates: 10°20′N 37°43′E
- Country: Ethiopia
- Region: Amhara
- Zone: East Gojjam

Area
  - Total: 73.5 km^{2} (28.4 sq mi)
- Elevation: 2,446 m (8,025 ft)

Population (2007)
  - Total: 62,497
  - Estimate (2021): 133,810
  - Density: 1,820.45/km^{2} (4,714.94/sq mi)
- Time zone: UTC+3 (EAT)
- Area code: +251

Debre Markos (Amharic: ደብረ ማርቆስ, romanized: Däbrä Marḳos lit: Mount of St. Mark) is a city, separate woreda, and administrative seat of the East Gojjam Zone in Amhara Region, Ethiopia.

== Etymology ==
Originally named Manqwarar (lit: Cold Place) (Note: Manqwarar was also spelled as Moncorer, Mankorar and the French variation was spelled as Menqouarer. it was still known as Manqwarar for quite a few decades after its name change to Debre Markos, as it could be seen on a world map published in 1917.), the town was founded in 1853 by Dejazmach Tedla Gwalu, the then ruler of Gojjam. In the 1880s, his successor Negus Tekle Haymanot built the Church of Markos, dedicated to Saint Markos, and named the town after it. (Note: Another version on its name change was from a German delegation led by Friedrich Rosen on 31 March 1905, the party claimed that town's name was changed from Manqwarar (Monkorer) to Debre Markos by Ras Bezabeh, the son of Tekle Haymanot of Gojjam, however the Rosen party also noted that they considered Bezabeh to be unimportant.).

== History ==
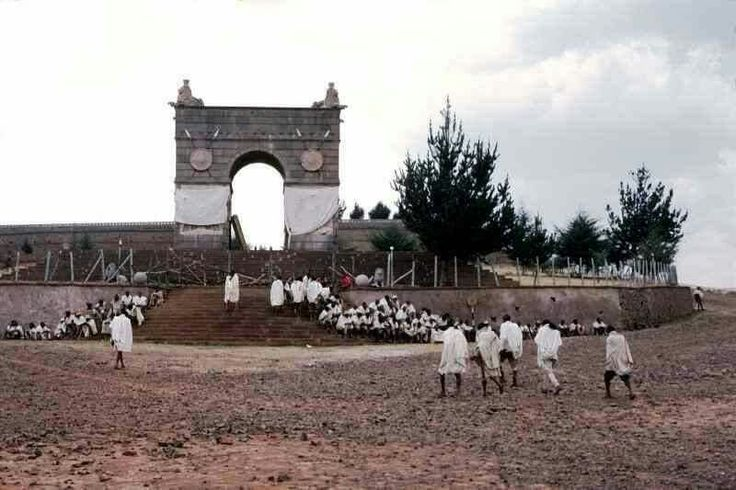
The arch of Negus Tekle Haymanot of Gojjam in Debre Markos

=== 19th century ===
In the early 1860s, Debre Markos (then Manqwarar) served as the seat of government for Dejazmach Tedla Gwalu, the governor of Gojjam under Emperor Tewodros II. In 1867, Tedla Gwalu's houses were burned down by his rival, Ras Adal Tessema, who then took control of the town and made it his capital.

In 1869, Debre Markos then became the seat of the provincial ruler, Ras Adal, who later assumed the name Tekle Haymanot and title Negus of Gojjam. But the town suffered further destruction in 1877 when Menelik II, King of Shewa, captured it. Menelik's chronicler notes that Shewan chiefs wanted to burn Adal's palace, but Menelik dismissed it as a mere hut. Despite claims of Menelik sparing the building, it was possibly destroyed, with the Gojjammes later using the event to demolish a palace in Shewa. During the reign of Tekle Haymanot, Richard Pankhurst notes, the population of Debre Markos "fluctuated greatly with the presence of absence of the army" of the Negus. Pankhurst further stated that when the Nigus (King) resided in the town, it had between 20,000 and 40,000 inhabitants; in his absence, between 5,000 and 6,000.

The explorer Pellegrino Matteucci arrived at what was at that time named Manqwarar on 3 June 1879, he found Ras Adal's restored palace atop a hill overlooking a vast area. Adal lived on the hill, separate from his soldiers, who camped in the valley below. His encampment was enclosed by a high wall with a single gate guarded by soldiers with spears. The largest building, 130 meters long and 10 meters high, had a thatched roof supported by 150 columns. It served as a general store, housing cannons and weapons, as well as ironware workshops.

=== 20th century ===
In March 1900 an expedition led by Percy Powell-Cotton visited Debre Markos and noted that "the town looked more like a town than Menelik's capital." In 1906, Felix Rosen wrote admiringly of Debre Markos' many flowering bushes, which filled the air with the scent of honey. He noted that its idyllic footpaths, lined with blooming hedges, reminded him of Lower Saxony or England.

The palace of Nigus Tekle Haimanot was remodeled in 1926 by his son Ras Hailu Tekle Haymanot, in the style of European buildings after his tour of Europe in the party of Ras Tefari. In 1935, the town had postal, telegraph, and telephone service.

The Italians arrived in Debre Markos on 20 May 1936. Through an interpreter, Achille Starace, who had arrived by plane, told the surprised local inhabitants that he had come to free them from their slavery. Debre Markos was later isolated and practically besieged by a revolt in 1938. General Ugo Cavallero, with sixty thousand men and supported by airplanes and tanks, had crushed the revolt by the end of May. A major Italian fortification was located in the city during the existence of Italian East Africa, and captured by the British Gideon Force and Ethiopian Arbegnoch (or Resistance Fighters) on 5 April 1941 during the East African Campaign.

In 1957, Nigus Tekle Haimanot School in Debre Markos was one of 9 provincial secondary schools in Ethiopia. The next year, the town was one of 27 places in Ethiopia ranked as a First Class Township. In 1960 a branch of the Ethiopian Electric Light and Power Authority had started operation in Debre Markos.

In 1968 locals in Debre Markos and surrounding districts rebelled against the regional administration after series of accumulated burdens on civilians. The final straw was an attempt to introduce a new agricultural income tax. The population resisted the tax assessors, sent the customary petitions to the emperor to reverse the order and, when no response was forthcoming, rose in rebellion. The rebellion was eventually put down by the national army. The locals however won their cause; the tax order was scrapped.

=== 21st century ===
In the national elections of 15 May 2005 the constituency of Debre Markos had 44 polling stations and 38,606 registered voters of whom 84% cast their votes. Coalition for Unity and Democracy dominated with 19,620 votes represented by candidate Ato Dereje Atinafu Dagachew. Far behind was the unpopular ruling EPRDF regime with 7,626 votes represented by candidate Ato Webishet Lengerih Mebirate. The United Ethiopian Democratic Forces party received 449 votes and two independent candidates 362 and 285 votes. The remaining 4,201 votes are not explained. After the national elections there were student demonstrations in Debre Markos and other towns in early June 2005. Human Rights Watch obtained reports of mass arrests of students by police.

== Geography ==
Debre Markos is located 300 km north-west of Addis Ababa along the Addis Ababa-Gondar road at an elevation of over 2400 meters. Debre Markos has an area of 73.5 square kilometers (28.38 square miles).

=== Climate ===
Debre Markos has a temperate and warm climate typical of the elevated portions of Ethiopia. The climate is classified subtropical highland (Köppen: Cwb), despite the proximity to the Equator. The minimum and maximum temperatures average between 14 and 20 °C. The mean annual air temperature is 17.3 °C. March and April are the warmest months with average temperature of 19.8.1 °C. July and August are the coldest months with average temperatures of 15.7 °C. The average annual temperature is 17.5 °C.

The average rain fall is considerably irregular going from 15 mm in January to 433 mm in July, being therefore still the main differentiator of the seasons of the year.

Climate data for Debre Markos elevation 2,515 m (8,251 ft)
Month	Jan	Feb	Mar	Apr	May	Jun	Jul	Aug	Sep	Oct	Nov	Dec	Year
Mean daily maximum °C (°F)	23.7 (74.7)	24.6 (76.3)	24.8 (76.6)	24.5 (76.1)	23.7 (74.7)	20.2 (68.4)	18.8 (65.8)	18.7 (65.7)	19.8 (67.6)	21.2 (70.2)	22.3 (72.1)	22.7 (72.9)	22.1 (71.8)
Daily mean °C (°F)	17.0 (62.6)	17.5 (63.5)	18.6 (65.5)	18.5 (65.3)	17.5 (63.5)	15.5 (59.9)	14.3 (57.7)	14.1 (57.4)	14.8 (58.6)	15.3 (59.5)	15.5 (59.9)	15.6 (60.1)	16.2 (61.1)
Mean daily minimum °C (°F)	8.3 (46.9)	9.6 (49.3)	11.3 (52.3)	11.3 (52.3)	11.6 (52.9)	10.1 (50.2)	10.3 (50.5)	10.3 (50.5)	9.8 (49.6)	9.1 (48.4)	8.3 (46.9)	8.3 (46.9)	9.9 (49.7)
Average precipitation mm (inches)	12 (0.5)	22 (0.9)	49 (1.9)	61 (2.4)	96 (3.8)	155 (6.1)	301 (11.9)	300 (11.8)	204 (8.0)	81 (3.2)	24 (0.9)	15 (0.6)	1,320 (52)
Average relative humidity (%)	36	36	42	44	51	72	81	82	71	58	48	48	56
Source: FAO

== Demographics ==
A 2012 estimate puts the population at 133,810. This gives a population density of 1820.54 people per square kilometer (4714.94 people per square mile), given its area of 73.5 square kilometers (28.38 square miles), very significantly higher than either the East Gojjam Zone average of 167.94 people per square kilometer (434.95 people per square mile) or the 122.24 people per square kilometer (316.60 people per square mile) average of the Gozamin woreda that surrounds the enclave.

Based on the 2007 national census conducted by the Central Statistical Agency of Ethiopia (CSA), Debre Markos had a population of 62,497, of whom 29,921 were men and 32,576 women. The majority of residents, 97.03%, practiced Ethiopian Orthodox Christianity, while 1.7% and 1.1% of the population were Muslim and Protestants, respectively.

The population reached about 60,600 in 2001, making Debre Markos the 13th largest town in Ethiopia.

The 1994 national census reported a total population for Debre Markos of 49,297 in 9,617 households, of whom 22,745 were men and 26,552 were women. The largest ethnic group of the town was reported to be the Amhara (97.12%) while the rest including Tigrayan (1.29%), Oromo (0.67%) and others comprising less than 1% of the population. The majority of the inhabitants practiced Ethiopian Orthodox Christianity, with 97.25% reporting that as their religion, while 1.88% were Muslim, and 0.81% were Protestant.

A population count in Debre Markos reached 44,410 in 1987, more than doubling in twenty years. The census counted 31,842 inhabitants in 1975, which was 10,000 more than at a previous census in 1967 which counted 21,536 residents.

== Culture ==
The town's principal church is dedicated to Markos.

== Economy ==
Debre Markos is located close to a strategic mountain, Mount Chokea, which is one of the major sources for the water tower of Africa. The mountain is the source of over 40 rivers and is located around 60 km north of Debre Markos and at 4100 meters above sea level. It is also a home of diverse wildlife, birds, clean air which creates stimulating memories and relives stress.

Debre Markos is also known for being a producer of prolific writers, monuments, poetries, and spirituals. It is close to historical traditional schools, including Dima Giorgis Orthodox church, The Emperor Asrat, The Mysterious religion, and The Palace.

According to Bradt travel guides, Debre Markos is the most accommodating town on the journey between Addis Ababa and Bahir Dar, the town's has several hotels and restaurants offering high standards experience for comparatively low prices.

=== Transportation ===
Construction on Africa's first electric bus manufacturing factory began on 43 hectares of land in Debre Markos in January, 2007 by Rus Afro Trolleybus, a joint Russian-Ethiopian partnership. CEO and major shareholder Getachew Eshetu predicted that the factory would have the capacity to manufacture 500 trolley buses per year, and employ 5,000 people.

The city had three highways and one airport, Debre Markos Airport but now it is not functional due to poor government attention.
