= Charles Tilstone Beke =

British geographer (1800–1874)

Charles Tilstone Beke (10 October 1800 – 31 July 1874) was an English traveller, geographer and Biblical critic.

== Biography ==
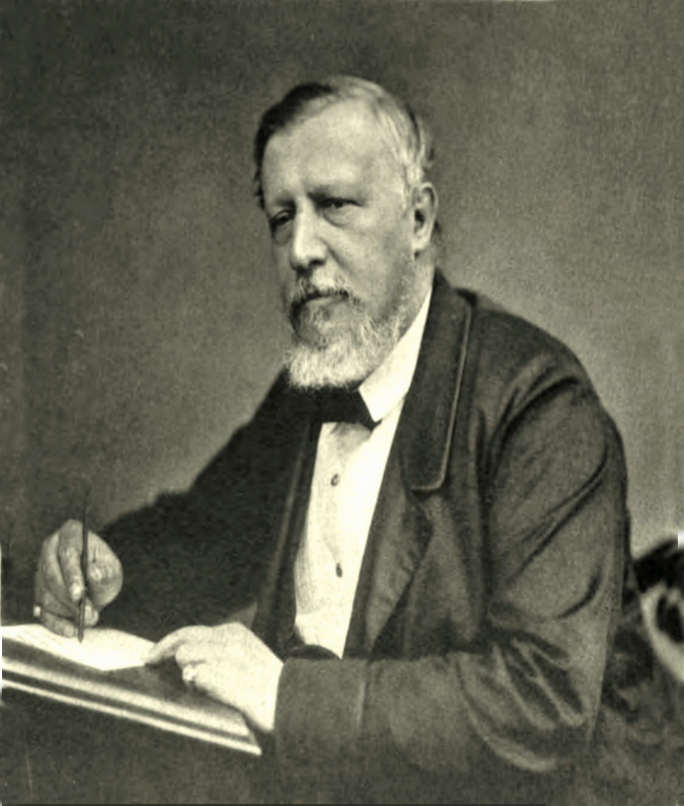
Charles T. Beke

Born in Stepney, London, the son of a merchant in the City of London, for a few years Beke engaged in mercantile pursuits. He later studied law at Lincoln's Inn, and for a time practised at the Bar, but finally devoted himself to the study of historical, geographical and ethnographical subjects.

The first fruits of Beke's researches appeared in his work Origines Biblicae or Researches in Primeval History, published in 1834. An attempt to reconstruct the early history of the human race from geological data, it raised a storm of opposition on the part of defenders of the traditional readings of the Book of Genesis, but in recognition of the value of the work, the University of Tübingen conferred upon him the degree of PhD.

Between 1837 and 1838, Beke held the post of acting British consul in Saxony. From that time until his death, his attention was largely given to geographical studies, chiefly of the Nile valley. Aided by private friends, he visited Ethiopia in connection with the mission to Shewa sent by the Indian government under the leadership of Major (afterwards Sir) William Cornwallis Harris, and explored Gojjam and more southern regions up to that time unknown to Europeans. Among other achievements, Beke was the first to determine, with any approach to scientific accuracy, the course of the Abay River (Blue Nile). The valuable results of this journey, which occupied him from 1840 to 1843, he gave to the world in a number of papers in scientific publications, chiefly in the Journal of the Royal Geographical Society.

On his return to London, Beke re-engaged in commerce, but devoted all his leisure to geographical and kindred studies. In 1848 he planned an expedition from the mainland opposite Zanzibar to discover the sources of the Nile. A start was made, but the expedition accomplished little. Beke's belief that the White Nile was the main stream was, however, shown to be accurate by subsequent exploration.

In 1856, he endeavoured, unsuccessfully, to establish commercial relations with Ethiopia through Massawa. In 1861-1862 he and his wife travelled in Syria and Palestine, and went to Egypt with the object of promoting trade with Central Africa and the growth of cotton in the Sudan. In 1865, he attempted to visit Ethiopia to negotiate from Emperor Tewodros the release of the British captives. On learning that the captives had been released, Beke turned back, but Tewodros afterwards re-arrested the party. To the military expedition sent to effect their release, Beke furnished much valuable information, and his various services to the government and to geographical research were acknowledged by the award of £500 in 1868 by the secretary for India, and by the grant of a civil list pension of £100 in 1870. In his 74th year he undertook a journey to Egypt for the purpose of determining the real position of Mount Sinai. He conceived that it was on the eastern side of the Gulf of Aqaba, and his journey convinced him that his view was right. It has not, however, commended itself to general acceptance. Beke died in Bromley, in Kent.

== Works ==
Beke's writings are very numerous. Among the more important, besides those already named, are An Essay on the Nile and its Tributaries (1847), The Sources of the Nile (1860), and The British Captives in Abyssinia (1865). He was a fellow of the Royal Geographical Society, and for his contributions to the knowledge of Ethiopia received its gold medal, and also that of the French Société de Géographie. But as a result of a controversy over the statements of a rival Ethiopian explorer, Antoine Thomson d'Abbadie, Beke returned the French medal.
