= East Gojjam Zone =

Zone in Amhara Region of Ethiopia

Coordinates: 10°20′N 38°00′E

East Gojjam ምሥራቅ ጎጃም Misraq Gojjam
- Zone
- Interactive map of East Gojjam
- Country: Ethiopia
- Region: Amhara
- Capital: Debre Markos

Area
  - Total: 14,004.47 km^{2} (5,407.16 sq mi)

Population (2012 est.)
  - Total: 2,351,855
  - Density: 167.94/km^{2} (434.95/sq mi)

A map of the regions and zones of Ethiopia

East Gojjam (Amharic: ምሥራቅ ጎጃም), also called Misraq Gojjam, is one of Zones in Amhara Region of Ethiopia. Its capital is Debre Markos. East Gojjam is named after the former province of Gojjam.

East Gojjam is bordered on the south by the Oromia Region, on the west by West Gojjam, on the north by South Gondar, and on the east by South Wollo; the bend of the Abay River defines the Zone's northern, eastern and southern boundaries. Its highest point is Mount Choqa (also known as Mount Birhan). Towns and cities in East Gojjam include Bichena, Debre Marqos, Debre Werq, and Mota.

This Zone was selected by the Ministry of Agriculture and Rural Development in 2004 as one of the several areas for voluntary resettlement for farmers from overpopulated areas; no specific woredas in this Zone were identified in this program. East Gojjam became the new home for a total of 20,000 heads of households and 80,000 total family members.

== Demographics ==
A 2012 census puts the population at 2,351,855. This gives a population density of 167.94 people per square kilometer (434.95 people per square mile), given its area of 14,004.47 square kilometers (5,407.16 square miles).

Based on the 2007 Census conducted by the Central Statistical Agency of Ethiopia (CSA), this Zone has a total population of 2,153,937, an increase of 26.68% over the 1994 census, of whom 1,066,716 are men and 1,087,221 women; with an area of 14,004.47 square kilometers (5407.16 square miles), East Gojjam has a population density of 153.80 people per square kilometer (398.35 people per square mile). While 213,568 or 9.92% are urban inhabitants, a further 8 individuals are pastoralists. A total of 506,520 households were counted in this Zone, which results in an average of 4.25 persons to a household, and 492,486 housing units.

The largest ethnic group reported in East Gojjam was the Amhara (99.82%); all other ethnic groups made up 0.12% of the population. Amharic is spoken as a first language by 99.81%; the remaining 0.19% spoke all other primary languages reported. 97.42% of the population said they practiced Ethiopian Orthodox Christianity, and 2.49% were Muslim.

The 1994 national census reported a total population for this Zone of 1,700,331 in 381,993 households, of whom 845,980 were men and 854,351 women; 145,295 or 8.55% of its population were urban dwellers at the time. The largest ethnic group reported in East Gojjam was the Amhara (99.83%); all other ethnic groups made up 0.17% of the population. Amharic was spoken as a first language by 99.88%; the remaining 0.12% spoke all other primary languages reported. 96.71% practiced Ethiopian Orthodox Christianity, and 3.18% of the population said they were Muslim.

According to a May 24, 2004 World Bank memorandum, 8% of the inhabitants of East Gojjam have access to electricity, this zone has a road density of 24.2 kilometers per 1000 square kilometers (compared to the national average of 30 kilometers), the average rural household has 1.1 hectares of land (compared to the national average of 1.01 hectare of land and an average of 0.75 for the Amhara Region) and the equivalent of 0.6 heads of livestock. 11.4% of the population is in non-farm related jobs, compared to the national average of 25% and a Regional average of 21%. 66% of all eligible children are enrolled in primary school, and 13% in secondary schools. 61% of the zone is exposed to malaria, and 30% to Tsetse fly. The memorandum gave this zone a drought risk rating of 447.
