= Sack of Harar =

Sack of Harar may refer to:

- Sack of Harar (1550) by Ethiopia, part of the Ethiopian invasion of Adal (1549–1550)
- Sack of Harar (1559) by Ethiopia, in which the last Walashma sultan was killed
