= Prokopiou =

Prokopiou (Greek: Προκοπίου) is a Greek surname. Notable people with the surname include:

- George Prokopiou (born 1946), Greek shipowner
- Georgios Prokopiou (1876–1940), Greek artist, photographer, and documentary filmmaker
