= Ethiopian invasion of Adal (1549–1550) =

1549–1550 Ethiopian military campaign against Harar

Date	1549–1550 (tenth regnal year of Gälawdewos, beginning 2 September 1549; the campaign lasted five months)
Location	Adal, present-day eastern Ethiopia
Result	Ethiopian victory
Territorial changes	Ethiopian capture of Harar

Belligerents
Ethiopian Empire	Adal Sultanate

Commanders and leaders
Gälawdewos; Fanuʾel	ʿUmardin (PKIA); Nūr b. Mujāhid

The Ethiopian invasion of Adal in 1549–1550 was a pair of campaigns launched by the Ethiopian Empire against Adal Sultanate. The first campaign was led by Emperor Gälawdewos's general Fanuʾel, who defeated the Muslim sultanate of Adal, and, according to the Chronicle of Gälawdewos, had killed one of two rival Muslim rulers while the other managed to escape. The second campaign, lasting five months in Gälawdewos's tenth year, was personally led the emperor, who succeeded in seizing and sacking its capital, Harar, and ousting the ruling Walashmaʿ sultan.

Among the minor leaders on the Adal side at the time was Nūr b. Mujāhid, later famous as amir of Harar and as the man who would kill Gälawdewos himself nine years afterward; in 1549–1550 he is mentioned only among the handful who survived Fanuʾel's earlier victory.

Islam in Ethiopia, written by J. Spencer Trimingham in 1952, similarly records that Harar's territory was invaded and the city sacked in 1550, but attributes this to the failure of Nūr's own earlier attacks on the Ethiopians. This account sits awkwardly with the primary chronicle's dating, since Nūr did not become amir of Harar until 1551/2 (see Historiography below).

== Background ==
The jihad led by Aḥmad b. Ibrāhīm al-Ghāzī ("Grañ") against the Christian kingdom collapsed with his death at the Battle of Wayna Daga in February 1543. In the years that followed, Gälawdewos worked to restore his kingdom's control over the eastern provinces it had lost. In October 1544 he defeated and killed the wazir ʿAbbās, who had attempted to build an independent power base from the provinces of Dawaro, Fäṭägar, and Bali. Around the same period, forces identified by Trimingham as those of Barakāt b. ʿUmar Dīn (later, in the 1550s, a Walashmaʿ sultan in his own right) and ʿAli Garād, a son of Aḥmad Grañ, invaded the Ethiopian province of Dawaro, urged on by Aḥmad's widow Bati Del Wambera. They were defeated and their leaders captured by the province's Ethiopian governor, and were later ransomed in exchange for Minās, Gälawdewos's brother, then a prisoner at Zabid; Historian Sevir Chernetsov independently dates this exchange to 1547 and specifies it was her own son who was traded. (Note: The Chronicle of Gälawdewos independently records that in March 1548, while the king campaigned in Damot, his general Fanuʾel, left in charge of "the whole eastern [provinces] such as Däwaro and its dependencies," defeated an invasion of those provinces, killing "hundreds" of the attackers. Since Dawaro was specifically the province under Fanuʾel's charge, this may well be the same episode Trimingham describes, with Fanuʾel as the unnamed "governor of the province," though neither source states the identification explicitly.)

At this stage Nūr b. Mujāhid, a nephew of Aḥmad Grañ and son of the wazir Mujāhid b. ʿAli Suha b. ʿAbdallah, one of Grañ's most influential generals, was still a minor figure in the Adal camp. After Grañ's death in 1543, Nūr had tried to keep the jihad alive but, as Wagner notes, "could not get hold of the town [Harar] proper, where the sultan might have been glad to have gotten rid of his master from the religious faction." He did not become "amir" and sāḥib al-fatḥ ath-thānī ("the leader of the new conquest") until AH 959 (1551/2 AD), after the events described here. Harar itself had been the seat of the Barr Saʿd ad-Dīn since Sultan Abū Bakr b. Muḥammad moved the capital there from Dakar in 1520. Following Abū Bakr's murder by Aḥmad Grañ in 1525, Aḥmad installed ʿUmardin, of the rival Muḥammad b. Azharaddin line of the Walashmaʿ family, as a powerless puppet sultan; Wagner's king-list dates ʿUmardin's nominal reign to 1525–1550, ending, on this reckoning, exactly when Gälawdewos's campaign reached Harar.

== Fanuʾel's expedition ==
According to the Chronicle of Gälawdewos, the king "wrote a letter of permission" authorizing Fanuʾel, described as chief of his army, to lead a campaign into the Barr Saʿd ad-Dīn itself. Fanuʾel did so: according to the chronicle, he killed one of "their two kings," and the other ran away, leaving behind all that he owned. He then sent the spoils of victory back to Gälawdewos rather than keeping them, having acted, in the chronicler's telling, on his lord's will rather than his own. The identities of the "two kings" mentioned here have yet to be determined in the secondary literature. They could be rival claimants to the sultanate or co-rulers of parts of the Barr Saʿd ad-Dīn, but no modern study has proposed a firm identification.

A separate Harari chronicle-note, distinct from the Chronicle of Gälawdewos and edited by Cerulli, independently dates Fanuʾel's entry into Harar itself, rather than the Barr Saʿd ad-Dīn generally, to Wednesday, 23 Ṣafar 957 AH (13 March 1550). The note records nothing beyond the bare fact and date of entry; Cerulli read its terseness as evidence that the raid was a swift surprise action rather than a prolonged siege, describing it as "more a fortunate incursion than an orderly conquest of the fortress." The same chronicle-note's far more detailed account of fighting, a two-day battle in which a sultan of Harar was killed, belongs to a separate, later entry dated 966 AH (1559) and concerns Ḥamälmal, not Fanuʾel (see Sack of Harar (1559)).

== Gälawdewos's campaign ==
Gälawdewos resolved to lead a campaign in person in the tenth year of his reign, which began on 2 September 1549, "to ravage the country of the Muslims as they ravaged his provinces." He marched into the Barr Saʿd ad-Dīn and remained there five months; the chronicler says the expedition's day-by-day course was recorded in a separate annal, the Bǝryamin. During the campaign, Ethiopian forces recovered Christian captives, took Muslim men, women, and children captive in turn, demolished stone fortifications, burned wooden buildings, and seized property as booty. The chronicle states that Gälawdewos "deposed their king from his throne and left him destitute of his wealth," leaving him nothing. From "the two valiant chiefs of the Muslims" he also captured a man named Abbas, apparently distinct from the wazir ʿAbbās, killed in October 1544, and put him in chains; Nūr, still a minor figure at this point, was driven off "by stones and sticks, like chasing away a dog."

The campaign continued into the mountainous parts of Adal territory, where Ethiopian forces destroyed further fortresses and "opened" fortified towns, leaving the country, in the chronicler's words, so devastated that "the birds could settle there." The chronicle explicitly refers readers to further, apparently now-lost annal, the Maṣḥafa Ḫoḫǝt Nagaśawi ("Book of the Royal Gate"), for a fuller account of "the destruction of Adäl and its surroundings" than it itself provides. This second phase of the campaign, led by the king himself, the chronicle's modern editor describes as "the destruction of the city of ʿAdal by the forces of the king," while secondary literature, relying mainly on William Conzelman's 1895 edition of the chronicle, has identified it specifically with the conquest of Harar and the deposition of its sultan. According to Cerulli's reading of the note from the Harari chronicle, it was Fanuʾel who carried out the entry into Harar, with Gälawdewos's own tenth-year campaign responsible for the wider destruction of the surrounding country rather than the capture of the city itself, though Cerulli presented this as an inference rather than a certainty.

== Aftermath ==
Gälawdewos does not appear to have imposed direct Ethiopian rule over Harar after its capture. As Wagner puts it in his separate history of Harar, "it seems that Gälawdewos did not establish a direct rule in the town, but only installed a new sultan from another line of the Walašmaʿ dynasty." He has proposed that, if the emperor installed a new sultan before withdrawing (a step none of the sources state outright), he would most plausibly have turned to the rival Muḥammad b. Āzar line and placed Muḥammad b. Abi Bakr, a son of the sultan Aḥmad Grañ had killed in 1525, on the throne. In his later published king-list of Harar's rulers, Wagner treats this reconstruction as settled enough to date outright, giving Muḥammad b. Abi Bakr's reign as 1550 to 1551/2, immediately following ʿUmardin's own reign of 1525–1550. Muth's independent entry on Nūr reaches the same identification, "possibly Muḥammad b. Abi Bakr," installed by Gälawdewos and later killed by Nūr. Chekroun is more cautious, treating the identity of any such successor as unrecoverable from the sources; she notes only that Gälawdewos may have left the throne vacant, or installed an unnamed figure, before departing the region.

Ethiopian ascendancy proved short-lived either way. In AH 959 (1551/2 AD), Nūr b. Mujāhid, who had married Bati Del Wambera, became amir of Harar. Two traditions describe how he took power. One, found in the chronicle record, has the Hararis acclaiming him as leader of a renewed jihad after his marriage to Bati Del Wambera. The other, a legendary tradition preserved in the Arabic History of Nūr b. Mujāhid, instead has him living as a hermit outside Harar when an old woman asks him to avenge her murdered son; he kills first the sultan's son and then the sultan himself, and the townspeople install him as ruler. Muth's EAe entry, following Wagner, reconciles the two traditions: "both traditions may in fact be true if one presumes that... Gälawdewos installed [in Harar] a new sultan, possibly Muhammad b. Abi Bakr, later killed by N.M. [Nūr b. Mujāhid], who then married Bati Dél Wämbära." On this reading, the sultan Nūr killed was the same Muḥammad b. Abi Bakr proposed above. Nūr then installed a new puppet sultan of his own, ʿAli b. ʿUmardin, whose accession a marginal note in a copy of the Walashmaʿ chronicle dates precisely to 24 December 1552. (Note: Wagner's later king-list carries the succession further: ʿAli b. ʿUmardin b. Muḥammad b. Azharaddin (1552–1555), Barakat b. ʿUmardin b. Muḥammad b. Azharaddin (1555–155?), and Ḥabib b. ʿUmardin b. Muḥammad b. Azharaddin (155?–1559), the last of whom was killed when Ḥamälmal sacked Harar in 1559.)

Nūr went on to build Harar's defensive wall and to lead the renewed offensives against the Christian kingdom that culminated, in 1559, in the death of Nūr's former enemy. Gälawdewos was killed in battle, and the last Walashmaʿ sultan, Ḥabib b. ʿUmar Dīn, was killed in a separate Ethiopian sack of the city led by the general Ḥamälmal (see Sack of Harar (1559)). (Note: EAe's own entries do not agree on the date of Nūr's own death: 6 September 1567 in Muth's "Nūr b. Mujāhid" entry, versus 1568 in Wagner's "Harär history till 1875" entry.)

== Historiography ==
Trimingham's 1952 book Islam in Ethiopia attributes the 1550 sack of Harar to Nūr's own "first ventures against the Abyssinians," in a passage that follows directly on his description of Nūr's accession as amir in 1551/2. Taken literally, this reverses the chronology demonstrated in the Chronicle of Gälawdewos and confirmed by Wagner's genealogical study, both of which place the sack of Harar in the king's tenth regnal year (1549–50), which is a year or more before Nūr came to power. Trimingham cites no specific source for the 1550 date. Modern works, particularly Solomon Gebreyes's 2019 translation of the full chronicle and Wagner's 1991 reconstruction of the Walashmaʿ succession, allows the sequence of events to be clarified with far more precision than was available to Trimingham.

It is worth noting that the tension between crediting either Fanuʾel or Gälawdewos isn't something that originated in recent times. As far back as 1931, when Cerulli was working on his book Documenti arabi per la storia dell'Etiopia, he faced the same problem. The note's date for the entry into Harar falls in Gälawdewos's tenth regnal year, yet it only named Fanuʾel, not the king.

== See also ==
- Adal Sultanate
- Ahmad ibn Ibrahim al-Ghazi
- Gälawdewos
- Nur ibn Mujahid
- Sack of Harar (1559)
- Walashma dynasty
- Emirate of Harar

== Bibliography ==
- Cerulli, Enrico (1931). "Documenti arabi per la storia dell'Etiopia". Memorie della Reale Accademia Nazionale dei Lincei, Classe di scienze morali, storiche e filologiche. 6th ser. 4 (2): 39–101.
- Chekroun, Amélie (2013). Le Futūḥ al-Ḥabaša: écriture de l'histoire, guerre et société dans le Bar Saʿad ad-dīn (Éthiopie, XVIe siècle) (PhD dissertation). Université Paris 1 Panthéon-Sorbonne.
- Conzelman, William E. (1895). Chronique de Galâwdêwos (Claudius), roi d'Éthiopie. Paris: Bibliothèque de l'École pratique des hautes études.
- Gebreyes, Solomon (2019). Chronicle of King Gälawdewos (1540–1559). Corpus Scriptorum Christianorum Orientalium. Vol. 668. Scriptores Aethiopici 117. Louvain: Peeters.
- Getatchew Haile, Getatchew; Wagner, Ewald (1989). "Die Geschichte Nūr b. Muǧāhids von Harar oder The History of Aṣe Zärʾa Yaʿqob". Zeitschrift der Deutschen Morgenländischen Gesellschaft. 139 (1): 43–92.
- Muth, Franz-Christoph (2007). "Nūr b. Mujāhid". In Uhlig, Siegbert (ed.). Encyclopaedia Aethiopica. Vol. 3: He–N. Wiesbaden: Harrassowitz. pp. 1208–1210.
- Trimingham, J. Spencer (1952). Islam in Ethiopia. London: Oxford University Press.
- Wagner, Ewald (1991). "The Genealogy of the later Walashmaʿ Sultans of Adal and Harar". Zeitschrift der Deutschen Morgenländischen Gesellschaft. 141 (2): 376–386.
- Wagner, Ewald (2005). "Harär history till 1875". In Uhlig, Siegbert (ed.). Encyclopaedia Aethiopica. Vol. 2: D–Ha. Wiesbaden: Harrassowitz. pp. 1015–1018.
