= Battle of Jarte =

1542 battle

- Part of the Ethiopian–Adal War, Ottoman–Portuguese conflicts (1538–57) and Somali–Portuguese conflicts
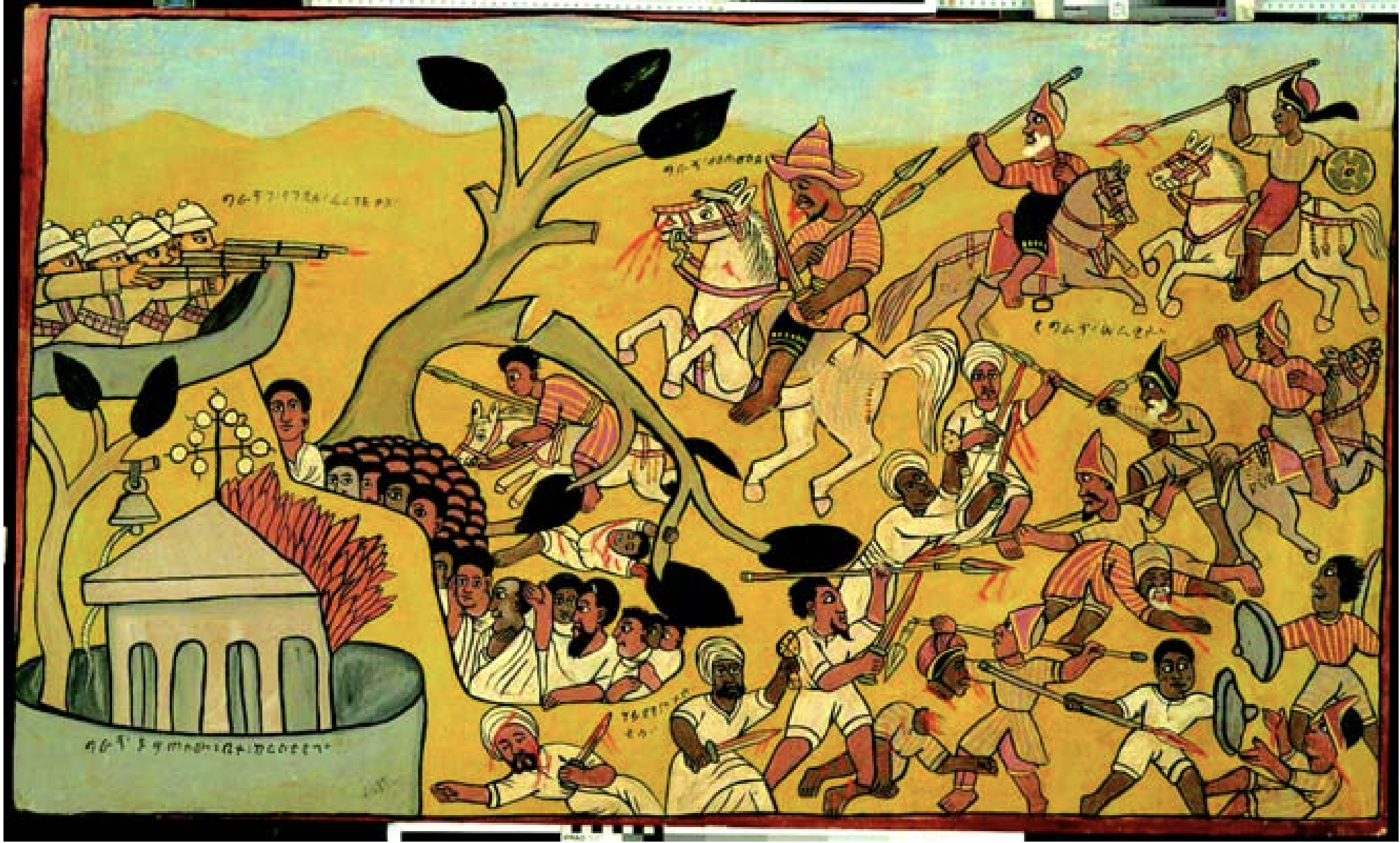
- The battle of the Portuguese against Ahmed Gragn, painted by Hailu Woldeyes c. 1935
Date	4 to 16 April 1542
Location	"Jarte," near Wajirat, Ethiopia
Result	Portuguese-Ethiopian victory

Belligerents
Portuguese Empire; Ethiopian Empire	Adal Sultanate

Commanders and leaders
Cristóvão da Gama; Seble Wongel	Ahmad ibn Ibrahim

Strength
400 Portuguese arquebusiers 200 Ethiopian auxiliaries	15,000 infantry 1,500–2,000 cavalry 200 Turkish arquebusiers

Casualties and losses
11 killed 50 wounded	300 killed 4 "principal captains" 40 horsemen 30+ Turks

The Battle of Jarte was fought from 4 to 16 April 1542 between the forces of Ahmad ibn Ibrahim al-Ghazi and the Ethiopian Empire assisted by a Portuguese expeditionary force led by Cristóvão da Gama. The Abyssinians and Portuguese were victorious, with Ahmad ibn Ibrahim al-Ghazi wounded by the outnumbered Christian force, and the Adalites forced to retreat.

== Prelude ==
Prior to the battle the Portuguese had marched for two days towards Jarte (or "Farte"), while they were pitching their camp, an envoy from the "Prester" arrived with a message for them "to march as quickly as might be, while he did the same, in order to join before meeting the King of Zeila, who had a large force, and with whom a fight by one alone would be perilous." Marching until reaching the plains, they met the lord of the local territory, who visited Cristóvão and presented him with "very handsome" horses, telling him that he knew their enemy was coming in search of them, and that many days couldn't pass before they met; that he should make what arrangements were necessary, and about sending out spies. The many spies ahead of their army then returned two days later with "news that the Moors' camp was near, and that we should meet before the next day." When Cristóvão found he couldn't avoid a battle with them without losing the reputation they'd gained, he accepted it over "losing our prestige-for victory is in the hands of God."

Pitching their camp the day before Palm Sunday, the queen (Seble Wongel) arrived to their rear. She was placed in the center of the camp, which was properly arranged to await for the "moors" as it occupied a hillock "near the stream of afgol" (Afgol Ghiorghis, Tigray?), the best site on the plain. The Muslim army then met the united army a league away, in an area on the edge of the Danakil Desert, sending out five horsemen as scouts who spotted them from the top of another hill and returned to give imam Ahmed information. Da Gama then sent two Portuguese horsemen to discover how large the Adal army was, and while setting up camp imam Ahmed, with 300 horsemen "and three large banners, two white with red moons, and one red with a white moon," examined the opposing forces as the rest of his army surrounded them. Appearing more numerous and strong-willed than they were due to large amounts of "trumpeting, drumming, cries, and skirmishing," there was constant fear of an Adal attack, but the Christians were ready for the fight. However, the Adal army did nothing but surround them until the next day as "they dared not attack us at night because our camp appeared from the outside very formidable, both because of the shots we fired from time to time, and because of the many lit matches they saw, of which they had great fear." Later marvelling greatly at "how he [de Gama] had the audacity to appear before him with so small a force; that indeed he seemed to be a mere boy, as rumour said, and innocent without experience." Offering to allow Cristóvão da Gama and his Portuguese to return to their country as Seble Wongel had deceived him. Ahmed then sent rosary beads and a cowl, insulting the Portuguese by likening them to friars. Cristóvão then replied that "he had come here by order of the great Lion of the Sea-That the following day he would see what the Portuguese were worth, and that he was not to go over to him; for they obeyed no lord save the King of Portugal" then sending small tweezers for his eyebrows and "a very large looking-glass," implying imam Ahmed was a woman.

== Battle ==
The Muslims did close to nothing for the next day, intending to starve some the Christians out. The Portuguese account states the involvement of 200 Turkish arquebusiers the Adal thought a great deal of, who allowed them to initially defeat Abyssinia. "They were indeed men of greater determination, for they came closer to us than any of the others, and helped him [imam] a good deal-Christovão had to send Manuel da Cunha and Inofre de Abreu with seventy men to dislodge them, which they did. The horsemen tried to support the Turks, and here some Portuguese were wounded. From the camp our artillery killed some horsemen, and wounded many Moors." Cristóvão then sounded his trumpets to recall them and, due to ever decreasing supplies and their opponents refusal to attack, arranged his forces with the queen at the center.

In the morning of Tuesday April 4, 1542, they began to march towards their enemy who shouted, trumpeted, and drummed, thinking them ensnared in their trap; the Christians then fired their matchlocks and artillery, killing "4 hourses and some foot. The Turks, seeing the damage caused by their offensive, advanced. Imam Ahmed saw them and charged as well, but his cavalry could not do the Portuguese harm due to their vanguard's bravery and the horses' fear of the gunfire. Cristóvão then halted his forces and allocated 50 of his troops to halt 100 advancing Turks. The brutal offensive wounded Cristóvão himself, who was struck by a bullet in the leg. Ahmad, seeing this, advanced to encourage his forces to charge and was shot in the thigh. When they saw him fall his three banners were lowered, signalling a retreat, and the Adalites carried him in their arms. When Cristóvão saw this he knew his adversary had been wounded, sounding the trumpets and kettledrums. The Portuguese shouted "Saint James!" and charged with the 200 Abyssinians; "We slew many and followed them a space, where the Abyssinians avenged themselves on the Moors, slaying them as if they had been sheep."

Due to Cristóvão da Gama not having a horse to pursue them, and due to the weakness of his forces, he contended himself with the victory (which was not a minor one). While in pursuit, the Queen had a tent pitched, her and her women bandaging the wounded with their own headgear and crying tears of joy as they had been in fear.

The Portuguese suffered over fifty wounded, chiefly by matchlock bullets; but their enemy paid heavily and the field was full of them: "The Abyssinians recognised four of the principal Captains of the King of Zeila; there lay dead on the field forty horses and 'thirty Turks'."

== Aftermath ==
After the victory, the Christian army wanted to rest, but the local ruler advised them not to due to the bad condition of the environment and to instead return to Ethiopian controlled land. Due to the Portuguese surgeon having been wounded in the right hand, Cristóvão da Gama had to tend to the wounded himself. The Portuguese would stay in the region for a week recovering and waiting for reinforcements from Massawa which would not arrive, meanwhile Seble Wongel sent out spies in disguise. Following their defeat at Jarte, Ahmed requested aid from the Ottoman governor of Yemen in Aden. This retinue of Turkish, Arab, and Albanian troops would later assist him in the Battle of Wofla.
