= Battle of Fatagar (1559) =

1559 battle between the Ethiopian Empire and Sultanate of Harar

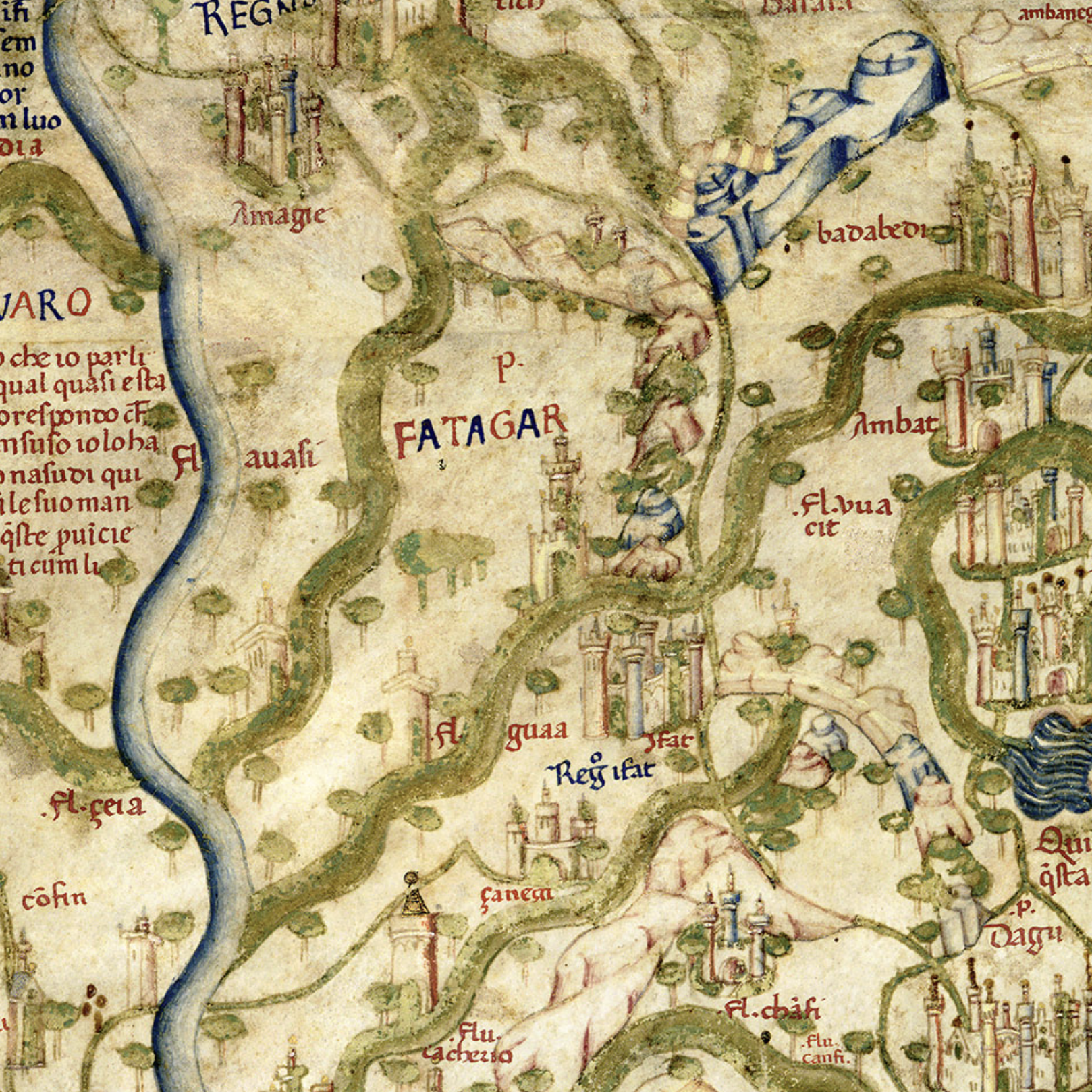
- The historical region of Fatagar depicted in Fra Mauro's world map c. 1450
Date	6 April 1559; 467 years ago
Location	Nech Sar, Fatagar, Ethiopian Empire (eastern border of Wollo)
Result	Adalite victory
Territorial changes	Adal succeeds in regaining control of the southern part of the Ethiopian Empire

Belligerents
Adal Sultanate	Ethiopian Empire

Commanders and leaders
Nur ibn Mujahid	Gelawdewos †

Strength
1,800 Cavalry; 500 Musketeers "Numerous" Large archers "Numerous" spearmen	Total:1,550; 250 Cavalry; 100 Musketeers; 500 Archers; 700 Foot soldiers

Casualties and losses
Minimal	Heavy

The Battle of Fatagar (alternatively known as Nech Sar) was a reprisal conflict between the previous participants of the Ethiopian–Adal War. It was fought between the forces of the Adal Sultanate led by Nur ibn Mujahid, and the Ethiopian Empire under Emperor Gelawdewos. The Ethiopian Emperor was later killed by Adal forces in this battle.

Mohammed Hassen considers this battle a decisive defeat for the Ethiopian Empire. "Not only did Galawdewos' death produce terrible grief throughout the Christian land, it left the political scene uncertain and fluid. After this battle, this force was never able to regain its full strength and failed to win back an inch of land lost before 1559 to the pastoral Oromo."

== Background ==
The de facto leader of Adal Bati del Wambara and widow of Ahmad ibn Ibrahim al-Ghazi had stipulated to Nur that she would solely marry him, if he were to cause the death of the emperor of Ethiopia. This achievement was necessary to pave the way for Nur in being acknowledged by the citizens of Harar, and the widow of Ahmed as the leader of Adal.

== Battle ==
Spanish Jesuit, Pedro Paez wrote that in March 1559, Gelawdewos was in the Kingdom of Oye, where Nur sent spies to see how strong he was and what he was doing, and on their return they said that he had many men and was occupying himself in festivities, and that in his court it was all singing and dancing, eating and drinking wine to excess. On hearing this, he called his chief officers and, telling them what was happening, made them swear not to drink wine under any circumstances. and at the same time he exhorted them to fast and to pray, together with the rest of the men, and in this they persevered for a long time. Later he sent his spies again, and they found the emperor and his men as before, with music and festivities, eating and drinking in excess; he gathered his captains and told them, 'It is now time for us to go against this man, because God has delivered him into our hands". Nur departed from his land straight away with the Malassay including 1,700 cavalry and many foot soldiers. According to J. Spencer Trimingham, Gälawdewos, then in Gojjam, had earlier sent his cousin Hamälmal to invade Harar, hoping to force Nur to turn back, but Nur held his ground and continued the campaign. When the emperor heard that he was coming, he went out to encounter him with many cavalry and foot soldiers.

However, the explorer Richard Francis Burton tells a slightly different account, adding that Gelawdewos had been supervising the restoration of Debre Werq when he received a message from Emir Nur challenging him to combat. When the Emperor met the Emir, a priest warned that the angel Gabriel had told him Gelawdewos would needlessly risk his life which caused most of the Ethiopian army to flee. James Bruce declared that the letter warned Gelawdewos to be prepared, as he would soon have to confront this threat that although imam was dead, there still remained a governor of Zeyla, whose family was chosen as a particular instrument for shedding the blood of the Abyssinian princes.

According to Galawdewos' chronicle, Nur invaded Fatagar to confront Gelawdewos and camped in one of the lands in the land of Fatagar. Gelawdewos went towards his camp and after twelve days he pitched his camp, having left a space between him and Nur a distance of a riflescope. On Maundy Thursday 1559, at six o’clock during the day, a battle took place between Gelawdewos and Nur. The battle was so fierce on that day, the smoke of the fire of the fighting covered the sun, as thick as fog. According to a Harari chronicle, early in the battle Galawdewos was shot with a hot bullet, but continued struggling until encircled by numerous Harari cavalry, which gave him a death blow. It was mentioned in the Gelawdewos' chronicle, that he was surrounded by about twenty horsemen who pierced his loin with a lance.

== Aftermath ==
Paez later mentions that the Adalites took many riches and captives and when they were about to celebrate their victory. He wrote that Nur replied to them that he had not achieved that victory through his own strength, but that God, no less, had given it to him. Therefore, in recognition of this, he said, "I will not ride a horse, showing pomp and splendour, but that humble ass instead." That is something truly notable and all the more worthy of consideration since the one who did that had less knowledge of God. When the celebrations ended, the great men asked Nur to release them from the oath that he had imposed on them not to drink wine, since the war was now over. But he refused outright to do so; instead, he obliged them to swear again, saying, "You will not drink any wine for three years, in acknowledgment of what I owe God for the remarkable victory that He has given me, because my army had been incomparably smaller than the emperor's."

Pankhurst stated the death of Gelawdewos had caused Christian military power in the area to crumble. Nur then severed the monarch's head and despatched it with him triumphantly, to the "Country of Sa'ad ad-Din". Gelawdewos' head was said to have been displayed in Harar for several weeks on a spear. Adalite chroniclers mentioned that they had seen the severed head with their own eyes. Bruce says that Bati del Wambara had his head tied by its hair on a tree's branch near her door which remained there for 3 years. The chroniclers later mentioned that he devastated the Abyssinian countries. Jeronimo Lobo also stated that Nur had laid waste to all the country and penetrated into the centre of Abyssinia. Many of his conquerors would execute the male inhabitants of these regions while sparing the women subsequently assimilating them.

Emir Nur spent a considerable period at Chercher, engaging in battles against the Amhara near Burka, close to modern-day Asba Tafari. He drove the Amhara south to Biyyoo Arabaa, scattering their troops. Additionally, the Muslims secured a notable victory over the Christian forces at a location known as Bakha. According to Arsi-Hadiyya tradition, Nur is said to have established his headquarters at Mogo in the south of Shewa chasing the Christian military forces reaching as far as Kaffa. During this westward expansion, the Semitic-speaking Hadiyya people from the Webi Shabelle River area composed a significant proportion of Nur's forces, alongside the Harari, Harla, and Somali tribes who traditionally dominated the Adal army. The Welbarag would migrate to the region at Mount Duro south-east of Lake Langano while some of the Silt'e flocked to Munesa. These groups later decide to settle permanently in this land. Emir Nur would endorse these military colonists to settle in the newly conquered territories as it would help expand the area of Islamic control westward towards the Christian heartlands. The remainders of the previous Christian population who had only survived the Ethiopian-Adal conflict, were not able to withstand these Hadiya conquerors.

The troops that were recruited from the eastern Horn of Africa for the conquest such as Somali soldiers, sometimes remained in the newly conquered western territories, like Hadiya, Sharkha, and Bale. The legacy of these people from the Ogaden remained in Arsi territory, identifiable by their ethnic origins, such as the Habr Yonis and Garjeeda clans. The Habr Yonis, originated from Hirna in the Chercher region, migrated westward during Nur's reign and settled east of Lake Zway, in areas suitable for livestock breeding whilst the Gajeeda clan spread among the Ittuu and Arsi. The Habarnosa claim descent from the Habr Yonis. Another troop of Nur's army reached the Gurage Mountains, where the descendants of these troops retained the name Barbare, believed to be derived from the Somali port of Berbera. This information was affirmed by the Barbare people from the Gurage Zone.

== Sources ==
- Spencer Trimingham, John (1952). Islam in Ethiopia. Oxford: Oxford University Press. OCLC 458382994.
