= Sack of Harar (1559) =

1559 Ethiopian military campaign against Harar

Date	c. 31 March – 1 April 1559 (Note: Two independent primary manuscript traditions preserve dates for this event. Cerulli's edition of the Walashma chronicle documents dates the entry into Harar to Thursday, 21 Jumada al-Akhir 966 AH (31 March 1559) and the decisive battle to the following day. A different Arabic manuscript, translated by Paulitschke, instead dates the sultan's death to 29 Safar 967 AH (30 November 1559), eight months later; Cerulli suggested this could reflect a confusion with the separate, earlier Christian raid of 1550. Contemporary scholars accept the spring 1559 dating for the event.)
Location	Harar, present-day Ethiopia
Result	Ethiopian victory

Belligerents
Ethiopian Empire	Adal Sultanate

Commanders and leaders
Ras Hamalmal	Sultan Habib b. ʿUmardin †

Casualties and losses
Minimal	Heavy

The Sack of Harar took place towards the end of March and the beginning of April 1559, when Hamälmal, a general and first cousin of the Ethiopian emperor Gälawdewos (Claudius), led a Christian force against Harar, then the seat of a Muslim sultanate ruled in the name of the Walashma' family, entering the city and looting and pillaging it. Subsequently, the reigning sultan, identified in several independent sources as Habib b. ʿUmardin, was killed in a battle that took place in "the land of our lord Hashim" near the town. The death of the sultan marked the end of a line of rulers belonging to the Saʿd al-Din/Walashma family, who ruled a series of Muslim states in the eastern Ethiopian highlands from the late thirteenth century. However, Harar did not remain in Christian hands; control of the town continued to rest with the amir Nur ibn Mujahid, under whom the Walashma sultans had already been reduced to nominal, tributary figures since 1552.

Hamälmal's expedition took place within days of a separate Battle of Fatagar in which Nur defeated and killed Gälawdewos himself; it is unclear whether the march on Harar was planned before the emperor's death or launched afterward. The event is reported almost entirely through Arabic literature from Harar and the Walashma dynasty; it is not mentioned anywhere in the surviving Ethiopian royal chronicle tradition, though it is independently corroborated in a Portuguese account based on a contemporary eyewitness resident in Ethiopia.

== Background ==
The Walashma dynasty had ruled Ifat as a tributary of Christian Ethiopia from the late thirteenth century; after Ifat's absorption into the Christian state in the early fifteenth century, the dynasty's surviving line re-established itself further east, ruling the Barr Sa'd al-Din (Adal) from its capital at Dakar.

In 1520 Sultan Abu Bakr b. Muhammad b. Azar moved the seat of government from Dakar to Harar. Five years later Abu Bakr was killed by Ahmad ibn Ibrahim al-Ghazi ("Grañ"), leader of a rival religious faction, who installed ʿUmardin Muhammad b. Azharaddin, from a different branch of the Walashma family, as a puppet sultan and made Harar the base for his conquest of Christian Ethiopia. After Ahmad Grañ's defeat and death at the Battle of Wayna Daga in 1543, his surviving forces fell back on Harar, and his nephew Nur ibn Mujahid attempted to reorganize the jihad, though he was at first unable to gain control of the town itself.

Around 1550 the emperor Gälawdewos led, or sent his general Fanuʾel on, a campaign that penetrated Harar and deposed the reigning sultan; the Christian royal chronicle does not record this episode. The Christians did not impose direct rule; instead, they are thought to have installed another member of the Walashma family, probably Muhammad b. Abi Bakr, in his place. In 1551/52 Nur ibn Mujahid entered Harar and, according to the legendary History of Nur ibn Mujahid, killed this sultan and his son before taking power himself as amir. Nur had married Ahmad Grañ's widow, Bati del Wambara, who is said to have required him to promise to avenge her husband before she would marry him.

Nur, in turn, restored a puppet sultan from the same line his uncle Ahmad Grañ had once favoured: over the following years three brothers, sons of ʿUmardin, reigned one after another. ʿAli b. ʿUmardin became sultan on 24 December 1552 and reigned until his death on 8 May 1555; he was succeeded the same day by his brother Barakat. The Futūḥ al-Ḥabaša names a third brother, Habib, as also having held the title of sultan. ʿAli, Barakat and Habib were the last rulers who can be linked to the Sa'd al-Din/Walashma genealogy.

By the late 1550s Nur ibn Mujahid, who had taken the title amir al-muʾminin, was preparing to resume the offensive against the Christian kingdom that Ahmad Grañ had begun. In 1559 he invaded Fatagar. According to Trimingham, Gälawdewos, then in Gojjam, responded by sending his cousin Hamälmal to invade Harar, hoping to force Nur to turn back, but Nur held his ground and continued the campaign. Historian Michael Kleiner instead states that Hamälmal marched on Harar immediately after, not before, Gälawdewos's death, dating the march to March 1559. Gälawdewos was killed at Fatagar on 27 Maggabit in the nineteenth year of his reign, 2 April 1559 by Chekroun's reading of the royal chronicle, correcting an earlier reading of 23 March.

== The sack ==
Hamälmal entered Harar on Thursday, 21 Jumada al-Akhir 966 AH (31 March 1559), taking advantage of the absence of Nur ibn Mujahid and his soldiers. Hamälmal's forces plundered the town during this initial entry. The following day, at noon, he confronted the sultan's forces at a place described in the chronicle only as "the land of our lord Hashim," in the immediate vicinity of the city. The sultan gave battle but was killed in the fighting, with the chronicle describing his death in the language of religious martyrdom.

The document prepared by Cerulli does not itself identify the murdered sultan, but rather Cerulli himself considered it possible that the sultan was Barakat. The connection with Habib, on the other hand, depends on two separate textual traditions. The sultan murdered by Hamälmal is identified as Habib twice in a separate Arabic document, translated by Philipp Paulitschke. In an additional, independent textual tradition, recorded in an Amharic-language chronicle edited by Bairu Tafla in the history of Asma Giyorgis, the ruler of Hararghe, Sultan Habib, is recorded to have been murdered by "Ras Hamalmal" during a war in a place called "Sayyedena Hashim." Wagner, in 1991, concluded, based on these parallel Arabic and Amharic traditions as well as on the corrected reading of Futūḥ al-Ḥabaša mentioned above, that Habib b. ʿUmardin, and not Barakat, is the ruler murdered in 1559. According to earlier sources, such as those written by Trimingham, Barakat had been named; Cerulli and Wagner had both, independently, asked themselves whether "Habib" was another name for him.

Cerulli also notes that Hamälmal's campaign against Harar goes unmentioned in any surviving Ethiopian royal chronicle. It is known only through Muslim Arabic- and Harari-connected sources, together with the corroborating Amharic chronicle tradition preserved by Asma Giyorgis, and not from any Christian court record. He further points out that this was actually the second time Harar had fallen to Christian Abyssinian forces in less than a decade: an earlier raid around 1550, which Cerulli attributes to Gälawdewos's general Fanuʾel, and then Hamälmal's own attack in 1559.

A further, independent notice of the episode survives in the Portuguese historian Diogo do Couto's Da Asia, drawing on the account of Gonçalo Soares Cardim, a Portuguese resident in Ethiopia from 1557 until 1577:

And while they [the Muslims] were marching with the intention of conquering the Empire there came to them news of how Abiticon Melahamcal [sic] (Note: Merid Wolde Aregay identifies "Abiticon Melahamcal" as Abetohon Hamälmal, abetohon being an ancient title given to princes.) had entered through their kingdom and killed their king, and how after he had withdrawn the Kaffir Galla entered through the lands and went devastating and destroying them. Abandoning everything they [the Muslims] hastened there to help, leaving the affairs of Ethiopia in some tranquility.

== Aftermath ==
Having defeated and slain Gälawdewos in Fatagar, Nur ibn Mujahid marched towards Harar carrying the head of the emperor as his trophy. On his way, he was confronted by Oromo warriors in the foothills of Mount Hazalo in Awash. During the ensuing battle, the Oromo suffered heavier losses than in any previous raid, while Nur won only a narrow victory at a heavy cost in men, before pressing on to Harar, where he found the city devastated.

The construction date of Harar's city wall remains controversial. Wagner believed the wall already stood before the 1559 attack, while Muth believed it was built in response to it. However, according to Chekroun, the decision to fortify the city was taken after Nur returned from the 1559 expedition that killed Gälawdewos, and before his own death in 1567/68. Chekroun cautions, however, that the wall's current state, with its five gates and five quarters all credited wholesale to Nur, cannot be confirmed archaeologically, and that this account is really an invention of nineteenth- and twentieth-century oral tradition and colonial-era travelogues.

After the death of Habib, no succeeding ruler of Harar traced his lineage or bore the title of the Sa'd al-Din/Walashma dynasty. Control of the city had actually shifted to Nur ibn Mujahid a number of years earlier, and Nur remained the ruler of Harar following Habib's death in 1559.

Shortly after Minas ascended the imperial throne following Gälawdewos, Hamälmal tried again to attack Nur, although the result of the campaign is not known.

== Legacy ==
The death of Habib b. ʿUmardin thus ended the dynasty, which could trace its pedigree, through the Saʿd al-Din genealogy, back to the Walashmaʾ sultans of Ifat in the late thirteenth century. Chekroun contends that the fall of this dynasty in 1559 was merely the culmination of a process of fragmentation which had started by the latter half of the fifteenth century at the very latest. In this view, the wars of the sixteenth century were not what brought the dynasty down; they simply marked the point at which a decline already long underway finally came to an end. Harar continued to be controlled effectively by the successors of Nur, sheltered behind the city's fortifications.

== Bibliography ==
- Bairu Tafla, Bairu (1987). Asma Giyorgis and his Work: History of the Gāllā and the Kingdom of Šawā. Äthiopistische Forschungen. Vol. 22. Stuttgart: Franz Steiner Verlag.
- Cerulli, Enrico (1931). "Documenti arabi per la storia dell'Etiopia". Memorie della Reale Accademia Nazionale dei Lincei, Classe di scienze morali, storiche e filologiche. ser. 6. 4 (2): 39–101.
- Chekroun, Amélie (2013). Le Futūḥ al-Ḥabaša: écriture de l'histoire, guerre et société dans le Bar Saʿad ad-dīn (Éthiopie, XVIe siècle) (PhD dissertation). Université Paris 1 Panthéon-Sorbonne.
- Chekroun, Amélie; Hirsch, Bertrand (2020). "The Sultanates of Medieval Ethiopia". In Kelly, Samantha (ed.). A Companion to Medieval Ethiopia and Eritrea. Leiden: Brill.
- Chekroun, Amélie (2022). "Harar as the capital city of the Barr Saʿd ad-Dīn (first half of the 16th century): from its emergence to its fortification". Annales d'Éthiopie. 34 (1): 23–44. doi:10.3406/ethio.2022.1710.
- Fauvelle, François-Xavier; Hirsch, Bertrand; Chekroun, Amélie (2017). "Le sultanat de l'Awfāt, sa capitale et la nécropole des Walasmaʿ". Annales islamologiques. 51: 239–295.
- Getatchew Haile, Getatchew; Wagner, Ewald (1989). "Die Geschichte Nūr b. Muǧāhids von Harar oder The History of Aṣe Zärʾa Yaʿqob". Zeitschrift der Deutschen Morgenländischen Gesellschaft. 139 (1): 43–92.
- Kleiner, Michael (2005). "Hamälmal". In Uhlig, Siegbert (ed.). Encyclopaedia Aethiopica. Vol. 2: D–Ha. Wiesbaden: Harrassowitz. pp. 982–983.
- Mercier, Héloïse (2022). "Writing and rewriting history from Harar to Awsa: a reappraisal of the Ta'rīkh al-mulūk". Annales d'Éthiopie. 34 (1): 45–70.
- Merid Wolde Aregay (1971). Southern Ethiopia and the Christian Kingdom, 1508–1708, with Special Reference to the Galla Migrations and their Consequences (PhD thesis). University of London, School of Oriental and African Studies.
- Muth, Franz-Christoph (2007). "Nūr b. Muǧāhid". In Uhlig, Siegbert (ed.). Encyclopaedia Aethiopica. Vol. 3: He–N. Wiesbaden: Harrassowitz. pp. 1209–1210.
- Trimingham, J. Spencer (1952). Islam in Ethiopia. London: Oxford University Press.
- Wagner, Ewald (1991). "The Genealogy of the Later Walashmaʿ Sultans of Adal and Harar". Zeitschrift der Deutschen Morgenländischen Gesellschaft. 141 (2): 376–386.
- Wagner, Ewald (2005). "Harär history till 1875". In Uhlig, Siegbert (ed.). Encyclopaedia Aethiopica. Vol. 2: D–Ha. Wiesbaden: Harrassowitz. pp. 1015–1018.
