= Lij Iyasu =

Uncrowned Emperor of Ethiopia from 1913 to 1916

Iyasu ኢያሱ
- Lij
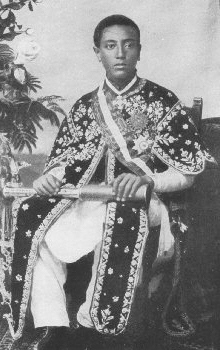
- Photograph of Iyasu

Emperor of Ethiopia
- Reign: 12 December 1913 – 27 September 1916
- Predecessor: Menelik II
- Successor: Zewditu
- Born: 4 February 1895; Dessie, Wollo, Ethiopian Empire
- Died: 25 November 1935 (aged 40); Addis Ababa, Ethiopian Empire
- Burial: Compound of St Markos Church
- Spouse: Seble Wongel Hailu
Names
- Kifle Yaqob (baptismal name)
- Dynasty: House of Solomon (Wollo Branch; cognatic)
- Father: Mikael Ali
- Mother: Woizero Shewaregga Menelik
- Religion: Ethiopian Orthodox (Unconfirmed allegations of conversion to Islam)

Lij Iyasu (Ge'ez: ልጅ ኢያሱ; 4 February 1895 (Note: The precise year of Iyasu's birth is not known. In the Chronicle of Abeto Iyasu and Empress Zewditu of Ethiopia, the year is incompletely given as "18…"; in the same chapter, Iyasu is said to have been 12 years old in EC 1901 (or AD 1908/9). In his notes to this passage, Reidulf K. Molvaer notes, "He was 13 or 14 rather than 12 years old (the 'family tradition' of Teferi Mekonnin and Imru Haile-Sellasie was that Iyasu was about three years younger than them.)" Prowess, Piety, and Politics: The Chronicle of Abeto Iyasu and Empress Zewditu of Ethiopia (1909–1930) (Koeln: Ruediger Koeppe, 1994), p. 314 and note. Molvaer notes that other traditions put the year of his birth in 1892 and 1897 (p. 558). The year "1887" given in the 1911 Encyclopædia Britannica is the EC date, not the Common Era; the author of the article confused the two.) – 25 November 1935) also known as Iyasu V was the designated Emperor of Ethiopia from 1913 to 1916. His baptismal name was Kifle Yaqob (ክፍለ ያዕቆብ kəflä y’aqob). Ethiopian emperors traditionally chose their regnal name on the day they were crowned, (Note: For instance, Tewodros II and Menelik II were respectively known as Kassa Hailu and Sahle Maryam before they were crowned.) and since he was never crowned, he is usually referred to as Lij Iyasu, "Lij" meaning child, especially one born of royal blood. (Note: While sometimes misinterpreted as Iyasu V, Lij Iyasu was never referred to as "Iyasu V" or even as an emperor during his rule, either by Ethiopians or by foreigners. Thus, in the treaty of commerce signed between the United States and Ethiopia in June 1914, the ruler of Ethiopia is referred to as "His Royal Highness, Prince Lidj Yassou".)

== Early life and ancestry ==
Lij Iyasu was born on 4 February 1895 in the city of Dessie, in the Wollo province of Ethiopia. Iyasu’s father was Negus Mikael of Wollo who was of Mammedoch Oromo descent, his mother Woizero ("Lady") Shoaregga, was a Shewan Amhara and the eldest daughter of Emperor Menelik II. Iyasu's father was Ras Mikael, Governor of Wollo and longstanding friend of Menelik. Mikael had been born Mohammed Ali and was a Muslim until 1875, when he converted to Christianity by order of Yohannes IV in Boru meda council in order to stay in power.

On some accounts of his genealogy, a sharifian genealogy preserved in Vatican Arabic Manuscript 1796 acquired in Harar by Enrico Cerulli indicates Iyasu's paternal family claimed descent from Prophet Muhammad. According to Alessandro Gori's analysis, the genealogy is depicted as a historical tradition rather than as a verifiable and independently traceable lineage.

== Emperorship ==
=== Background ===
Late in his life, Emperor Menelik was confronted with the problem of his succession; if he did not explicitly name an heir before he died, the nation he had built would likely dissolve into civil war and be devoured by European colonial powers. He had four possible heirs. According to the traditional rules of succession, the next direct patrilineal descendant was the grandson of Menelik's uncle, Dejazmach Taye Gulilat. His other three heirs were all in the female line. The first of these was his oldest grandson, Dejazmach Wosan Seged, son of his daughter Shoaregga Menelik by her first marriage to Wedadjo Gobena. The second heir of the female line was his younger grandson Lij Iyasu. Finally, the third heir of the female line was Menelik's elder daughter Woizero Zewditu, who was married to Ras Gugsa Welle, nephew of the Empress Taitu.

Menelik refused to consider Taye Gulilat, whom he deeply disliked. Wosan Seged was eliminated from consideration due to dwarfism. In March 1908, at any rate, Wosan Seged was in poor health and dying of tuberculosis. It was clear that the aristocracy would not respect a woman as their leader, so Zewditu was also not seriously considered at this time. On 11 June 1908, Menelik experienced a stroke while on pilgrimage to Debre Libanos. On 15 May 1909 Menelik informed his ministers that Iyasu would succeed him. However, due to Iyasu's youth, Menelik agreed to the suggestion that he appoint a Regent (Enderase) (Note: Equivalent to Regent.) during the minority of his heir apparent. Until Iyasu came of age, the elder statesman Ras Tessema Nadew would be Regent Plenipotentiary (Balemulu 'Enderase).

In May 1909, shortly before the Emperor made this decision, Lij Iyasu was married to Woizero Romanework Mengesha, the daughter of Ras Mengesha Yohannes, granddaughter of Emperor Yohannes IV, and the niece of Empress Taitu. However, that marriage was annulled without having been consummated. Subsequently, in April 1910, Iyasu married Seble Wengel Hailu, the daughter of Ras Hailu Tekle Haymanot of Gojjam.

=== Regency ===
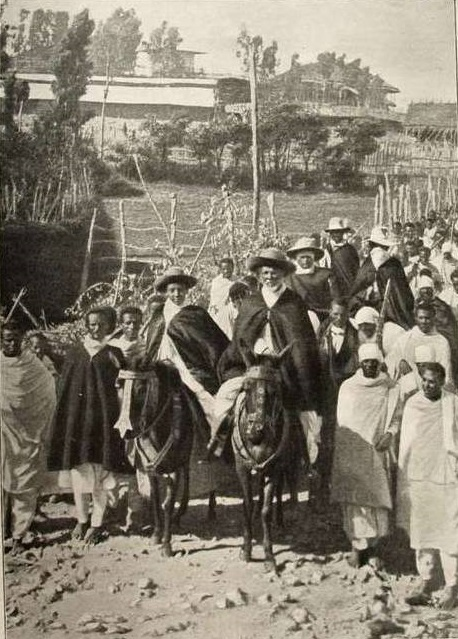
Lij Iyasu with the new regent, Ras Tessema

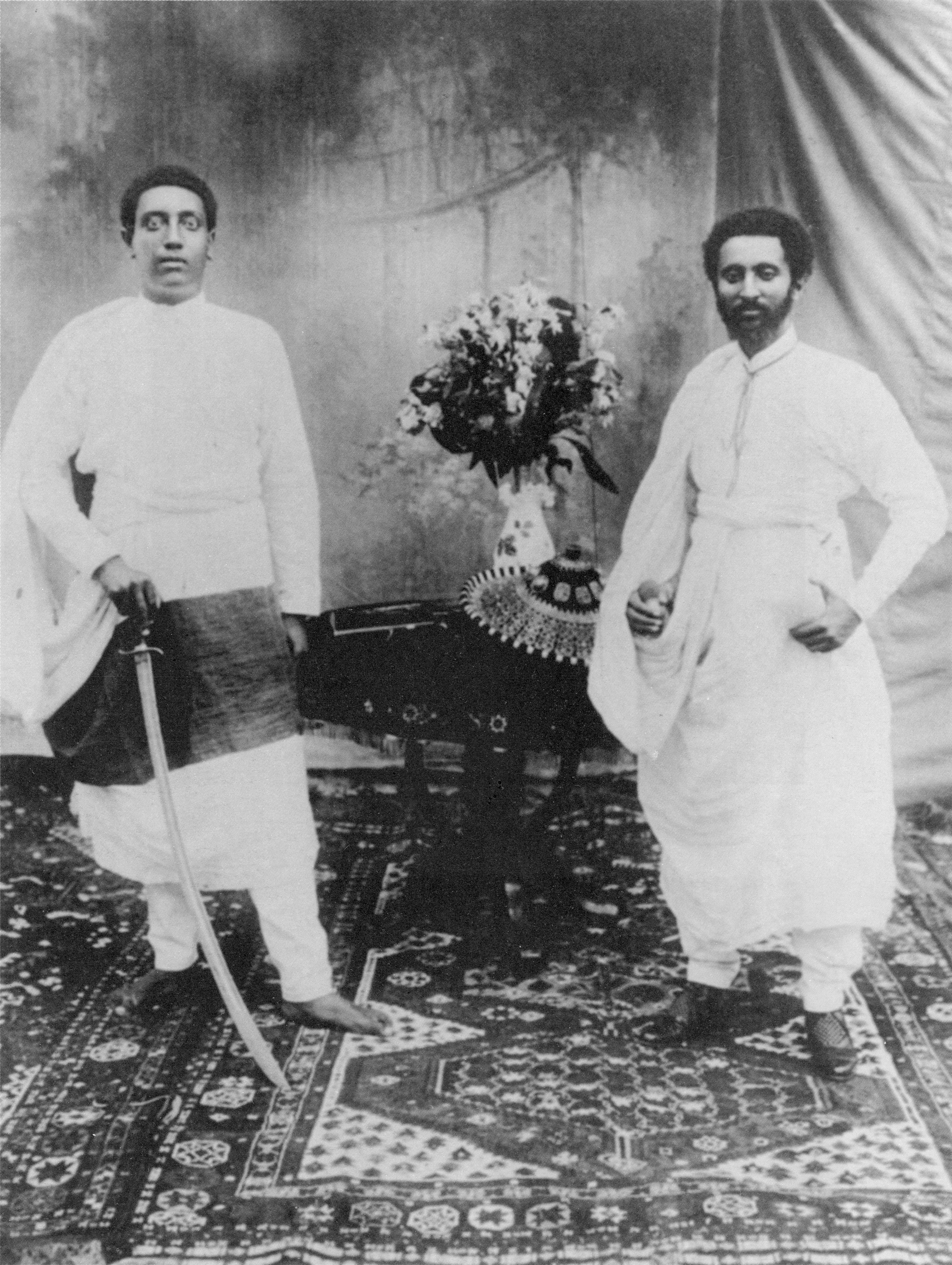
Lij Iyasu with Dejazmach Teferi (later Emperor Haile Selassie I).

Not long after his decision that Lij Iyasu would succeed him, Emperor Menelik succumbed to further strokes. These eventually left him a mere shell of his once-powerful self, and incapacitated until his death in 1913. During his last years, in a bid to retain power, Empress Taitu intrigued against his choice, intending to substitute either her step-daughter Leilt Zewditu or her daughter's husband Ras Gugsa Welle (who happened to be Taitu's nephew) for Iyasu. In response to Taitu's intriguing, a number of nobles organized in an ever-closer alliance against her. On 28 October 1909, after a massive stroke, Menelik's choice of Iyasu as his heir was made public with Ras Bitweded Tessema Nadew as regent.

The new regent found his authority undermined not only by the still living but paralyzed Emperor Menelik, but also by the Empress. For example, she insisted that questions from the foreign legations in Addis Ababa be directed to her, not to Tessema. Furthermore, Tessema himself suffered from an illness, which left him appearing helpless and apathetic and would take his life within a year. It took a coup d'état engineered by a group of aristocrats and the head of the Imperial Bodyguard to convince Ras Tesemma and Habte Giyorgis to decisively limit the influence of the Empress. Despite these developments, the imperial government continued to falter: administrators were unwilling to make decisions because Tessema himself might be overthrown, and foreign affairs likewise suffered. Despite this, Harold Marcus notes that the presence of Tessema "did curb ministerial dissensions and intrigues and was a reminder of the existence of central authority."

With Tessema, Iyasu continued Menelik's program of modernization, including the establishment of the first police force in Addis Ababa. On 10 April 1911, Tessema Nadew died and, when the council met to appoint a successor as Enderase, Lij Iyasu demanded a role in the process. When asked whom he desired in the position, he is reported to have replied, "Myself!" On 11 May, the seal of Iyasu replaced that of his grandfather, although not with the style of Emperor.

Marcus describes Iyasu's abilities as a ruler:

From the very beginning of his de facto reign, Lij Iyasu showed that he was not the stuff from which great monarchs were made. He was bright, but also impulsive, cruel, lascivious, prone to depressions and egocentricities, and politically inept. Despite his vision of an Ethiopia in which religion and ethnic affiliations made no difference in a man's political or private career, he had no clear comprehension of the power realities in the empire, nor of his own position as its ruler.

In the first year, he was faced with several serious challenges to his rule. On 31 May, Ras Abate attempted a coup d’état by seizing the arsenal and its modern weapons in the palace, but was eventually convinced to make a public submission in return for being allowed to depart for his estates in the southern provinces. On 14 July, an attempt was made to poison Iyasu. That same year Menelik's soldiers sent a delegation demanding back pay and regular supplies, which made clear that the government was on the brink of financial insolvency. Intelligence reached Iyasu's father, Ras Mikael, of another plot, and he arrived on 14 November in Addis Ababa with an army of 8,000 men. This was only the first of many efforts Ras Mikael made to keep his son on the Imperial throne. Mikael established a powerful position behind the scenes.

At this point, Lij Iyasu decided to leave the capital, ostensibly on a military expedition against the Afar, but he simply traveled through eastern Shewa and into Wollo, meeting with the common people. He had promised to return to Addis Ababa in May 1912, but instead visited Debre Libanos, then Addis Alem, before joining Dajazmach Kabbada's expedition into southwest Ethiopia. Here Lij Iyasu took part in a series of slave raids, in which 40,000 people of both sexes were captured, "half of whom died en route of smallpox, dysentery, hunger and fatigue." Marcus explains this constant journeying beyond the capital by his will "to prove that the government could not function without him and to force the ministers to authorize his immediate coronation."

Once he finally returned to the capital, he came into conflict with the commander of the Imperial Bodyguard, which was eventually settled by the mediation of Abuna Mattewos. The conflict began when Iyasu expressed his wish to the ministers that the incapacitated Emperor be removed from the Imperial Palace so that Iyasu himself could take up residence there. Trying to please the heir, the ministers asked for an audience with Empress Taitu and suggested that she take the Emperor to Ankober as a change of scene that might be beneficial for his health. Taitu had however been informed that Iyasu was intent on moving into the Imperial Palace, and defiantly refused to move either herself or her husband from the Palace. Informed of this exchange, the commander of the Imperial Bodyguard swore that he would protect the Emperor in his palace with his life. Angrily, Iyasu ordered the palace complex surrounded by his soldiers and only allowed in enough food for the Emperor himself. With Iyasu's soldiers in a tense standoff with the Imperial guard, the situation deteriorated to the point that gunfire was exchanged, and the bedridden Emperor had to be moved to the cellars as his bedroom windows were shattered in the battle. Hearing the guns, the Archbishop rushed to the scene and arranged for a ceasefire. Empress Taitu then emerged from the palace to publicly berate Iyasu as an ungrateful child who wanted to kill his grandfather. She angrily declared that neither she nor the Emperor would be going anywhere and returned to her rooms. Iyasu was thwarted, but demanded vengeance against the commander of the Imperial Bodyguard. Although he had wanted him severely punished, he was convinced to accept a sentence of banishment from the capital. Iyasu indulged in a lavish celebration, which led the European diplomats to conclude "that he was purposely neglecting urgent business and impeding the ministers from carrying out their duties".

Lij Iyasu left the capital after little more than a month, and during this time engaged in a raid upon the Afar, who had reportedly massacred 300 of the Karayu Oromo at the village of Sadimalka on the Awash River. Unable to find the responsible parties, he made a punitive raid upon the general population which provoked a general uprising of the Afar. On 8 April, after repeated messages from his father to return to the capital, he finally did arrive at the city and managed to accomplish nothing. On 8 May, Iyasu left to meet his father in Dessie.

== Reign ==
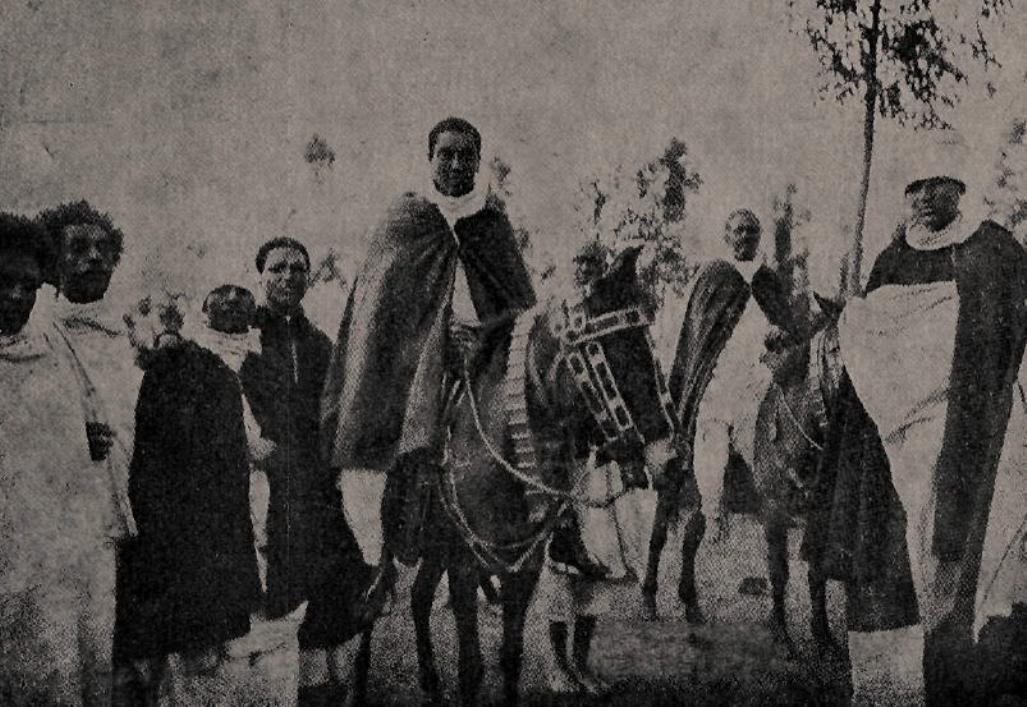
Iyasu and his retinue, ca. 1914.

On the night of 12–13 December 1913, Emperor Menelik II died. Iyasu was informed of his grandfather's death. The Emperor's body was secretly locked away in a small room adjoining the Se'el Bet Kidane Meheret (Our Lady Covenant of Mercy) Church on the grounds of the Imperial Palace. No public announcement of the Emperor's death was made, and no requiem or any type of mourning ritual was allowed. Empress Taitu was immediately expelled from the Imperial Palace and sent to the old palace on Mt. Entoto. Lij Iyasu's aunt, Zewditu Menelik, was also removed from the palace and banished into internal exile at her estates at Falle. By mid-January, the news had slipped through the official wall of silence. On 10 January 1914, the leading nobles of Ethiopia had gathered to discuss their response to his loss and the future of Ethiopia. "Although no records of the 1914 meeting have come to the author's notice," Marcus admits, he states that "it is safe to conclude" that their arrival in Addis Ababa "indicated their fidelity to Menelik's heir." However, they opposed his immediate coronation, although they did approve of his proposal to crown his father "Negus of the North".

Lij Iyasu showed a pronounced lack of interest in the day-to-day running of the government, leaving most of the work for the ministers to deal with. However, the cabinet of ministers remained largely unchanged from the days of his grandfather, and by now the ministers wielded much power and influence. They were constantly subject to insults and disparagement by Lij Iyasu who referred to them as "my grandfather's fattened sheep." He constantly spoke of his intention of dismissing "these Shewans", as he called them, and appointing new officials and creating a new aristocracy of his own choosing. His essentially reformist orientation clashed with the conservatism of his grandfather's old ministers. As Paul Henze notes, Iyasu "seems deliberately to have antagonized the Shewan establishment. He lacked the diplomatic skill and the refined sense of discretion that came naturally to Tafari."

Iyasu's many capricious acts served only to further alienate the aristocracy. One was his betrothal of his royal-blooded cousin Woizero Sakamyelesh Seyfu to his former driver, Tilahun. Another was the appointment of his Syrian friend, the rubber merchant Hasib Ydlibi, to the position of Nagadras (or Customs-Master) at the railway depot at Dire Dawa, thus giving him control of the vast tariffs and customs that were collected there. All this, combined with Iyasu's frequent absences from the capital, created the ideal environment for the ministers, led by Fitawrari Habte Giyorgis, the Minister of War, to plot his downfall.

=== Alleged conversion to Islam ===
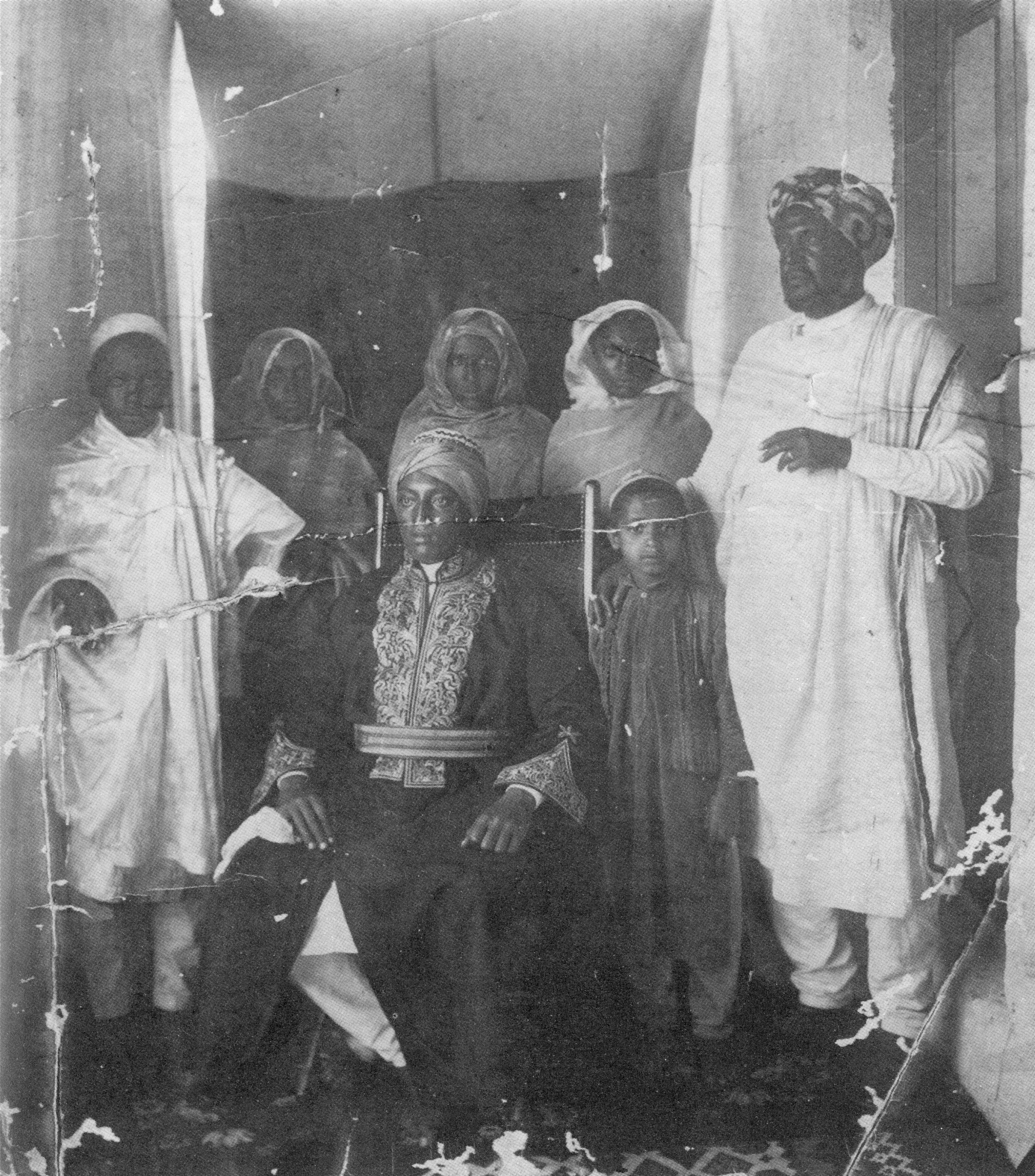
Lij Iyasu wearing a Muslim turban with Abdullahi Sadiq.

In 1914, Iyasu assigned Abdullahi Sadiq with the governorship of Ogaden, a decision that was vehemently opposed by the British. In February 1915, Iyasu travelled to Harar with Abdullahi Sadiq, who had become his constant companion, and went to the largest mosque of the city, the Jamia Mosque, for a three-hour service. Throughout his stay in Harar he was friendly towards the Muslims, an act which worried the priests of Ethiopia; when he remained in this Muslim community over Easter, they were scandalized.

However, the foreign delegations in Addis Ababa had been lobbying for him to join their sides in World War I. According to Marcus, many of the Ethiopian nobility and commoners were impressed by the early successes of the Central Powers, and both listened eagerly to German and Turkish propaganda concerning events. Both sides sought Ethiopian support: the Central Powers wanted the Ethiopians to drive the Italians out of Eritrea and Somalia. Rumors circulated that, in return for Iyasu invading the Sudan with 50,000 soldiers, he would be rewarded with the strategic port of Djibouti. At a minimum, the Allies sought to keep Ethiopia neutral.

In August 1915, Iyasu went to French Somaliland in disguise, without informing either French diplomats in Addis Ababa or even the colonial government. There he spent two days in mysterious meetings. Although Marcus states that "What actually happened will not be known until information from the French archives becomes available," Fitawrari ("Commander of the Vanguard") Tekle Hawariat Tekle Mariyam, a fervent reformer and a onetime friend of Iyasu, states in his recently published autobiography that the Djibouti trip was something of a vacation for Lij Iyasu, and that he spent much of his time consorting with Muslim notables in the city and consuming large amounts of qat as well as completely depleting the funds of the Ethiopian mission in the French colony.

Around the same time, the British reported that documents preaching jihad against the Europeans had been posted in the Harar marketplace. That August, the British reported that supplies were being sent to Jijiga to support the activities of Mohammed Abdullah Hassan and Sheikh Hassan Barsane, a devout Muslim pair who were at war with the British and Italians in Somalia and Somaliland. Then in September, the Italians revealed that one of their Somali agents had witnessed Iyasu declaring to an assemblage of Muslim leaders that he was a Muslim, and swore to his apostasy on a Quran. Although Harold Marcus accepts these reports at face value, Bahru Zewde is more suspicious of their veracity and instead argues that Iyasu's intent was to integrate the Somalis into the Ethiopian Empire, but "Allied ingenuity lent palpability to Iyasu's apostasy (which was the main charge levelled against him) by forging pictures and documents to prove the charge." Whatever the truth, these reports brought the simmering discontent with Iyasu to a fierce boil against him. European colonial powers in the region began supporting a coup d'état against Iyasu because of signs he was about to join World War 1 on the opposing side.

=== Fall ===
On 27 September 1916, while at the city of Harar, Lij Iyasu was deposed in favor of his aunt, Zewditu. The nobility under the leadership of Fitawrari Habte Giyorgis Dinagde had assembled in the capital and charged Lij Iyasu with apostasy, alleging that he had converted to Islam and had thus forfeited the Imperial crown. The Coptic Archbishop Mattewos, after some hesitation, was convinced to release the nobility from its oath of loyalty to Iyasu, and he was declared deposed from the throne and excommunicated from the Church. The assembly of nobles then named Zewditu Menelik as Empress of Ethiopia, and Dejazmatch Tafari Makonnen was elevated to the title of Ras, and made heir to the throne. Iyasu sent an army to attack Addis Ababa, which was met at Mieso and turned back. His father initially hesitated, then marched south from Dessie with 80,000 troops. On 27 October, Negus Mikael was defeated at the Battle of Segale. According to Paul Henze, Iyasu had reached Ankober the morning of the battle with a few thousand loyal followers, and after witnessing his father's defeat, fled towards the Eritrean border. On 8 November, Iyasu appeared in Dessie where he vainly sought the support from the nobility of Tigray and then the Italians. On 10 December, Iyasu fled and took refuge with his followers on the abandoned amba of Maqdala. At Maqdala, he was surrounded and subjected to an uninspired siege. On 18 July 1917, Iyasu slipped through the siege lines and rallied the peasantry of Wollo to revolt. On 27 August in Wello, troops under Habte Giyorgis defeated the rebels and captured many of Iyasu's generals, including Ras Imer. After this defeat, with a few hundred picked men, Iyasu fled to the desert of the Afar Triangle, where he roamed for five years. On 11 January 1921, Iyasu was captured and taken into custody by Gugsa Araya Selassie. He was handed over to the custody of his cousin Ras Kassa Haile Darge. Ras Kassa kept Iyasu in comfortable house arrest at his country home at Fiche.

Empress Zewditu I, who in spite of having been treated harshly by her nephew seems to have had considerable sympathy for Iyasu's fate, is said to have tried to have him handed over to her personal custody in order that he "be brought back to Christ and salvation" under her guidance. In her view, the most serious part of his fate was his excommunication, and she deeply wanted to save her nephew from what she regarded as assured damnation. While her plea to have her nephew moved to the Imperial Palace in Addis Ababa was vehemently vetoed by both Fitawrari Habte Giorgis and by the Crown Prince, Ras Teferi Makonnen, the Empress took care that Iyasu lived in luxury and was supplied with whatever he desired. Ras Kassa also adhered to this policy for as long as Iyasu was in his custody, so the terms of Iyasu's imprisonment were not particularly harsh.

== Later years ==
Empress Zewditu died in 1930, and was succeeded by Emperor Haile Selassie, who was considerably less sympathetic to Iyasu. Haile Selassie upon becoming emperor revealed the ten offenses that caused Iyasu's dethronement:

1. He married four Muslim women. 2. He spent governmental money to build mosques in Jigjiga. 3. He gave the Ethiopian flag to a foreign consul in Addis Ababa on a Moslem holiday. 4. He was seen in a worship service in a mosque wearing Somali costume. 5. He was seen reading the Koran. 6. His bodyguards wore uniforms with an Islamic banner. 7. He restored a church land to Moslems in Harar after 32 years since Ras Makonnen gave it to priests. 8. He gave his daughter to a Moslem guardian. 9. He traced his genealogical origins to the prophet in rejection of his Solomonic origins. 10. On the day when Menelik died he spent the day at a horse show instead of mourning for the one who gave him the throne.

In 1931, Iyasu escaped from imprisonment at Fiche. He apparently achieved his freedom with the aid of his former father-in-law, Ras Hailu Tekle Haymanot of Gojjam, although Haile Selassie claimed that the Italians had a hand in his escape – or at least planned to assist in Iyasu's attempt to regain the throne. In his autobiography, Haile Selassie reports that when Italian Baron Raimondo Franchetti landed his plane in a field outside of Addis Alem, onlookers "noticed that inside it were a machine-gun as well as rifles and many cartridges" – implying these were to arm Iyasu's followers.

Iyasu was recaptured shortly after his escape. (Note: These four days of Iyasu's escape, a man "out of sight, but never forgotten", are recounted by Anthony Mockler.) Having deeply alienated Ras Kassa with his escape, and having angered the Emperor, Iyasu was taken to a fortress on the slopes of Mount Gara Muleta in Girawa, (Note: David Buxton describes his visit to this prison in the mid-1940s. Travels in Ethiopia, 2nd ed. (London: Benn, 1957), pp. 133f) where he was guarded closely by locals loyal to Emperor Haile Selassie. When the forces of Italy invaded Ethiopia in 1935, aircraft of the Royal Italian Air Force scattered fliers asking the population to rebel against Haile Selassie and support the "true Emperor Iyasu V." It was feared that the Italians would make use of Iyasu to fragment Ethiopian resistance to their conquest.

In November 1935, Iyasu's death was announced. The circumstances surrounding his death and his burial place remain shrouded in mystery. One rumour that persists to this day is that Emperor Haile Selassie ordered his guards to kill him. Others dispute this and allege that Iyasu died of natural causes. His grandson and current Iyasuist claimant to the Ethiopian throne, Lij Girma Yohannes, claims that Iyasu's body was brought to the Church of St. Mark at Addis Ababa's Guenete Leul Palace (since 1961 the main campus of Addis Ababa University) and buried there in secret. Because he had been excommunicated, these claims are extremely unlikely. Another recently published account states that Iyasu was interred in the grave prepared for Emperor Haile Selassie's confessor and almoner, Abba Hanna Jimma, at Debre Libanos. This account contends that, upon the priest's death, Lij Iyasu's remains were moved to the crypt of St. Tekle Haimanot's Church at the monastery, and placed below the tomb prepared for Ethiopia's first Patriarch, Abuna Basilios.

== Family ==
His younger sister Zenebe Worq was married off at a young age to Ras Bezabih of Gojjam, but died in childbirth. Iyasu also had an elder half-sister, Woizero Sehin Mikael, married to Jantirar Asfaw, Lord of Ambassel, whose daughter would eventually become Empress Menen Asfaw, wife of Emperor Haile Selassie. Another half sister of Lij Iyasu was Woizero Tewabech Mikael, second wife of Ras Seyoum Mangasha of Tigray. While through his Imperial mother, Iyasu could claim to be descended from King Solomon and the Queen of Sheba, through his father, he claimed descent from Muhammad. (Note: This genealogy is published in Wallis Budge, E.A. (1970) [1928]. A History of Ethiopia: Nubia and Abyssinia. Oosterhout, the Netherlands: Anthropological Publications. pp. 546f.) Iyasu married Abubakr Ibrahim Chehem's granddaughter Fatuma married in 1913. After Iyasu was deposed in 1916, Fatuma fled into French-controlled territory, where she gave birth to a son named Menelik in September 1917. Iyasu seems to have had at least thirteen secondary wives and an uncertain number of natural children, several of whom have been Iyasuist claimants to the Imperial throne, as well as grandchildren like Girma Yohannes. Lij Iyasu's only legitimate child was a daughter born in 1916 to him and Seble Wengel Hailu, Alem Tsahai Iyasu, who was granted the title of Emebet-hoy by Emperor Haile Selassie.

== Evaluation ==
The Ethiopian historian Bahru Zewde describes Iyasu's reign as "one of the most enigmatic in Ethiopian history." A common account of his reign is provided by J. Spencer Trimingham, who writes that his acts favoring Islam were

...encouraged by German and Turkish diplomats. He made the fuqaha construct a genealogy deriving his ancestry on his father's side from the Prophet. He made prolonged stays in Harar where he adopted Muslim dress and customs. He put away his Christian wife, Romane-Warq, and started a harim by marrying the daughters of 'Afar and Oromo chiefs, including a daughter and niece of Abba Jifar of Jimma. He built mosques at Dire Dawa and Jigjiga. In 1916 he officially placed Abyssinia in religious dependence upon Turkey, and sent the Turkish consul-general an Abyssinian flag embroidered with a crescent and the Islamic formula of faith. He sent similar flags to his own Muslim chiefs and promised to lead them to the jihad. He entered into negotiations with Muhammed ibn 'Abd Allah, the Mahdi of the Ogaden, and sent him rifles and ammunition. He then issued a summons to all Somalis, some of whom regarded him as true Mahdi, to follow him in a jihad against the Christians, and went to Jigjiga to collect an army.

According to Fitawrari Tekle Hawariat Tekle Mariyam, Lij Iyasu at one point announced "If I do not make Ethiopia Muslim, then I am not Iyasu." He also recalls Lij Iyasu's visit to Dire Dawa in 1916, when the ruler walked into a Roman Catholic church in that city (this act alone would scandalize the Ethiopian Orthodox establishment) and commenced to light and smoke a cigarette while Mass was being conducted. Tekle Hawariat concludes that Iyasu was completely unsuited for the throne, and that his deposing was necessary for the survival of the Empire and the good of the people.

Bahru Zewde on the other hand, while admitting that "contradiction and inconsistency were the hallmark of his character and policies", notes that Iyasu's reign was characterized by "a series of measures which, because of the social and economic security they implied, may well be considered progressive." Iyasu modernized many sections of the Ethiopian criminal code, and created a municipal police force, the Terenbulle. His overtures to the Muslim inhabitants of Ethiopia "can be interpreted as one of trying to redress the injustices of the past, of making the Muslims feel at home in their own country."

However, Iyasu had the misfortune of being succeeded (in Bahru Zewde's words) "by a ruler of extraordinary political longevity who found it in his interest to suppress any objective appreciation of the man." According to Paul B. Henze, during the reign of his cousin Haile Selassie, Iyasu was "practically an 'unperson'. If he was referred to at all, it was invariably in extremely negative terms." While admitting the lack of information about this man, Henze suggests that "the fairest conclusion that can be reached on the basis of present knowledge may be to credit him with good intentions but condemn him for intemperate, inept and in the end, disastrous performance."

== Honours ==
=== National ===
- Knight Grand Cordon of the Order of Solomon

=== Foreign ===
- Knight Grand Cross of the Order of Leopold (Austro-Hungarian Empire, 1912)
- Knight Grand Cross of the Order of the Crown of Italy (Kingdom of Italy, 1912)
- Honorary Knight Grand Cross of the Royal Victorian Order (United Kingdom, 7 September 1911)

== Notes and references ==
Footnotes

Citations

== Bibliography ==
- Henze, Paul B. (2000). Layers of Time. A History of Ethiopia. New York: Palgrave Macmillan. doi:10.1007/978-1-137-11786-1. ISBN 0-312-22719-1.
- Marcus, Harold G. (1995). The Life and Times of Menelik II: Ethiopia 1844–1913. Lawrenceville: Red Sea. ISBN 1-56902-010-8.
- Mockler, Anthony (2002). Haile Sellassie's War. New York: Olive Branch Press. ISBN 978-1-56656-473-1.
- Nicolle, David (1997). The Italian Invasion of Abyssinia 1935–1936. Westminster, MD: Osprey. p. 48. ISBN 978-1-85532-692-7.

Lij Iyasu House of Solomon Born: 4 February 1895 Died: 25 November 1935
Regnal titles
Preceded by Menelik II	Emperor of Ethiopia (Never crowned); 12 December 1913 – 27 September 1916	Succeeded by Zewditu I
