= Sabla Wangel Hailu =

Ethiopian aristocrat and wife of Emperor Lij Iyasu

- Woyzero
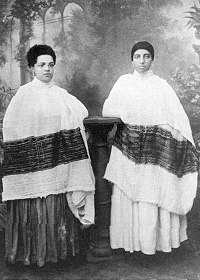
- Sabla Wangel Hailu (right) with her daughter

Empress-designate of Ethiopia
- Tenure: April 1910 – 1916
- Born: 1895–1896; Gojjam
- Died: 1969 (aged 72–73)
- Spouse: Lij Iyasu (1910–1916)
- Issue: Alem Tsahai Iyasu
- Dynasty: House of Solomon
- Father: Hailu Tekle Haymanot
- Mother: Woyzero Askale Mariam
- Religion: Ethiopian Orthodox Tewahedo

Sabla Wangel Hailu (Amharic: ሰብለ ወንጌል ሀይሉ; 1895/1896 – 1969) was an Ethiopian aristocrat and the second wife of the uncrowned Emperor of Ethiopia, Lij Iyasu.

== Name ==
Sabla Wangel Hailu is frequently confused with her 16th-century ancestor, Empress Sabla Wangel, whom the modern people of Gojjam also believe to have been connected to their region. To differentiate the two famous women, people refer to the earlier queen as Sabla Wangel 'Teleq' (the great) or 'Kedamawit' (the first), while the modern Sabla Wangel is referred to with the suffixes 'Hailu', derived from her father's name, 'Dagmawit' (the second), or 'Tinishi' (the little).

== Biography ==
Sabla Wangel Hailu was born the daughter of Hailu Tekle Haymanot, the ruler of Gojjam, and Askale Mariam Mengesha.

=== Marriage to Lij Iyasu ===
At the age of 14, she was selected by the Emperor of Ethiopia, Menelik II, to marry his presumptive heir, Lij Iyasu. The marriage was an alliance between the throne and a powerful Christian family, as well as an attempt to reduce the political influence of Menelik's wife Itege Taytu, as Sabla Wangel had no links to Taytu's family. She was the first of Ras Mengesha's descendents to marry a designated heir to the throne, the second being Medferiashwork Abebe. As Lij Iyasu's first, brief marriage to Romane Werq was probably unconsummated, Sabla Wangel may have been his only official wife.

Sabla Wangel had one daughter with Iyasu, named Alem Tsahai Iyasu. The pair divorced in 1916.

=== Later life ===
Sabla Wangel's paternal grandfather, Tekle Haymanot of Gojjam, had rebuilt a church at Mängəśtä Sämayat in 1887. In 1956, Sabla Wangel restored this church once more. The church's founding was associated with the 16th century queen of Lebna Dengel, also called Sabla Wangel. A memorial text written on the modern Sabla Wangel's death in 1969 records:

She loved Our Lady Mary deeper in her heart and due to this, she built a wonderful church in her name called Mängəśtä Sämayat, the country of Säblä Wängel the first, the wife of Ləbnä Dəngəl, King of Ethiopia.

— Herman 2009, p.7

== Family ==
- Father: Hailu Tekle Haymanot (1868–1950)
- Mother: Woyzero Askale Mariam
- Husbands and their respective issue
1. Lij Iyasu (1895–1935, div. 1916)
  1. Alem Tsahai Iyasu, married Dejazmach Abebe Asfaw
2. Dejazmach Yigezu Behabte
3. Dejazmach Mangasha Jimbirre
