= Taytu Betul =

Empress of Ethiopia from 1889 to 1913

Taytu Betul ጣይቱ ብጡል
- Itege
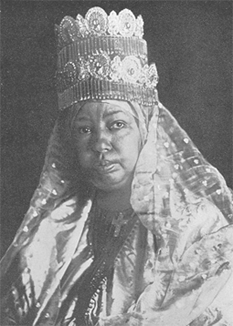

Empress of Ethiopia
- Tenure: 10 May 1889 – 12 December 1913
- Coronation: 4 November 1889

Queen consort of Shewa
- Tenure: 1883 – 9 March 1889
- Born: 1851; Semien, North Gondar, Ethiopian Empire
- Died: 11 February 1918 (aged 66–67); Addis Ababa, Ethiopian Empire
- Burial: Ba'eta le-Mariam Monastery
- Spouse: Menelik II
- Father: Betul Haile Maryam

Taytu Betul (Amharic: ጣይቱ ብጡል Ṭaytu Bəṭul ; baptised as Wälättä Mikael; 1851 – 11 February 1918) was Empress of Ethiopia from 1889 to 1913 and the third wife of Emperor Menelik II. An influential figure in the anti-colonial resistance during the late 19th-century Scramble for Africa, she, along with her husband, founded the modern Ethiopian capital Addis Ababa in 1886.

According to Chris Prouty, Taytu was considered an xenophobic empress, who intensely distrusted Europeans. In her own country, Taytu is still honored today as a great empress and leader. She is particularly revered and recognized by the Christian community of Ethiopia, having made numerous donations throughout her life to the Ethiopian Orthodox Church, notably to fund pilgrimages to Jerusalem.

== Early life ==
According to Raymond Jonas, Taytu Betul (or Taitu) was born in Semien, North Gondar, Ethiopian Empire. Scholarly consensus is that she was born at about 1851. Taytu's father, Ras Betul Haile Maryam, was part of the ruling family of Semien that claimed to be descendants of the Solomonic Dynasty through Emperor Susenyos I. Taytu's uncle was the Amhara warlord Wube Haile Maryam who governed the Semien and Tigray princedom.

She received a rigorous religious education, like most young women from the local Christian nobility. She also studied Amharic, law, international affairs, and politics. Taytu Betul was also groomed for marriage at a very young age, and her first marriage took place when she was just 10 years old to an officer of Emperor Tewodros II. Information about her early life and adolescence, however, remains scarce. Her first husband was imprisoned during a military campaign. Taytu Betul then married a second time, to the "dejazmach" Taklé Guiorguis, from whom she separated in order to marry a richer and more powerful man. This second marriage failed after she incited her husband to revolt against Yohannes IV. The plot discovered, she was forced to accept a less prestigious marriage to a simple soldier. After these four unsuccessful marriages, Taytu married a non-commissioned officer of Sahle Maryam, Negus of Shewa, and then the officer Fitaorari Zekargatchou, Sahle Maryam's brother-in-law. A final marriage to Ras Ouoldié allowed her to meet the Negus. Taytu Betul thus experienced several marriages before meeting and marrying the future emperor.

=== Marriage to Menelik ===
When Taytu Betul met Sahle Maryam, the ruler of Shewa, the latter's marriage to his first wife, Princess Altash, daughter of Emperor Tewodros II, was over. He was then infatuated with the courtesan Bafana, who was quickly replaced by the arrival of Taytu Betul, famous for her slender fingers and fair complexion. Taytu Betul and Sahle Maryam married in April 1883.

This marriage united two people with strong ambitions and complementary strengths for their rise to imperial power. Taytu's keen political acumen and leadership skills were complemented by a geopolitical advantage. Indeed, the future empress's family had support in the north, the ancestral home of the two previous emperors, Tewodros II and Yohannes IV: northerners were thus favored in the race to the throne. She also brought to the marriage considerable wealth through farmland and pastures, as well as a vast network of economic exchanges thanks to her relatives. Since Sahle Maryam came from the south, this marriage to Taytu granted her local legitimacy.

== Empress ==
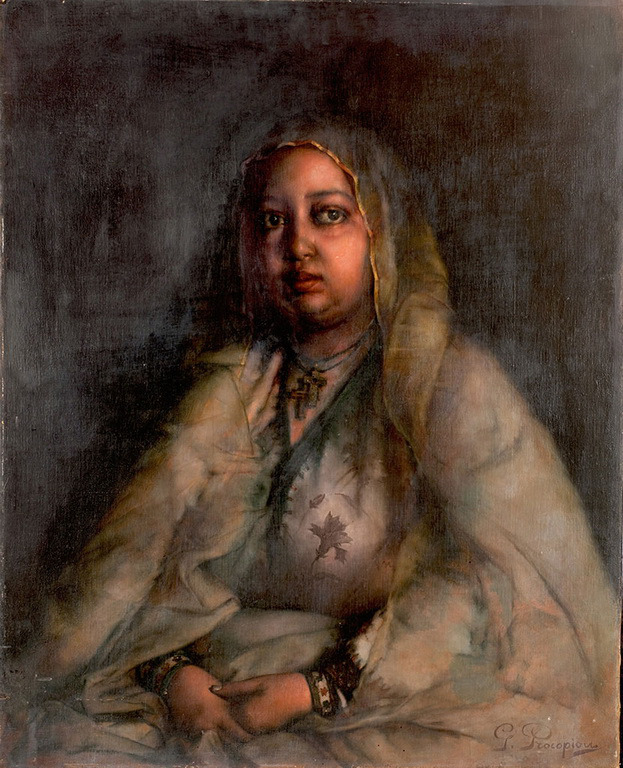
The Empress of Ethiopia Taytu Betul in 1905 by Georgios Prokopiou

Taytu is acknowledged to have wielded considerable political power both before and after she and Menelik were crowned Emperor and Empress in 1889. She led the conservative faction at court that resisted the modernists and progressives who wanted to develop Ethiopia along western lines and bring modernity to the country. According to the historians, she was always consulted by the Emperor prior to making important decisions. Thus, Empress Taytu was a key player in the conflict over the Treaty of Wuchale with Italy, which she tore up. Empress Taytu was the first to motivate the hesitant Emperor and other men to stand up against the Italians. Deeply suspicious of European intentions towards Ethiopia, she was a key player in the conflict over the Treaty of Wuchale with Italy, in which the Italian version made Ethiopia an Italian protectorate, while the Amharic version did not do so. The Empress held a hard line against the Italians, and when talks eventually broke down, and Italy invaded the Empire from its Eritrean colony, she marched north with the Emperor and the Imperial Army, commanding a force of cannoneers at the historic Battle of Adwa that resulted in a humiliating defeat for Italy in March 1896. This victory was the most significant of any African army battling European colonialism. Menelik II and Taytu Betul were temporarily in possession of 4,000 prisoners of war. Menelik, who often prevaricated and postponed unpleasant decisions by answering "Yes, tomorrow" (Ishi, nega), found it useful to have his wife be in a powerful enough position to say "Absolutely not" (Imbi) to people and issues he just did not want to personally offend or refuse.

When Menelik's health began to decline around 1906, Taytu began to make decisions on his behalf, angering her rivals for power through her appointment of favorites and relatives to most of the positions of power and influence. As a means to curb her family's political influence at court, Menelik selected Sabla Wangel Hailu as the heir-presumptive Lij Iyasu's wife, as her family had no ties to Taytu's. Taytu was widely resented for her alleged Gonderine xenophobia and nepotism, and the nobility of Shoa and Tigray, along with the Wollo relatives of Lij Iyasu conspired to remove her from state responsibility. In 1910, she was forced from power, and a regency under Ras Tessema Nadew took over. Instructed to limit herself to the care of her stricken husband, Taytu faded from the political scene. Taytu and Menelik did not have any children. Menelik died in 1913 and was succeeded by his grandson from a daughter of a previous liaison, Lij Iyasu. Taytu was banished to the old Palace at Entoto, next to the St. Mary's church she had founded years before, and where her husband had been crowned Emperor.

While some believe Taytu may have played a part in the plot that eventually removed Emperor Iyasu V from the throne in 1916, replacing him with Empress Zauditu, the price for Zauditu's elevation was a divorce from Taytu's nephew Ras Gugsa Welle, who became governor of Begemder. Zauditu, Menelik II's daughter by yet another previous marriage, had always been close to Empress Taytu and invited Taytu to live with her. Although Taytu declined she resumed advising rulers "in a modest way," to quote Chris Prouty.

== Later years ==
Taytu lived out the next few years at the old palace next to the Entoto Maryam Church overlooking Addis Ababa. She requested permission to go to Gondar in November 1917 to end her days, but was refused; she died three months later. She is buried next to her husband at the Taeka Negest Ba'eta Le Mariam Monastery in Addis Ababa.

== Legacy ==
The figure of the empress Tatyu became quite popular in Italy as "Queen Taitù", generally representing the type of a despotic woman who maintains vanity-based behaviour or makes inappropriate demands. The negative connotation of the character was created, at the end of the 19th century, by the reports of Italian journalists in Ethiopia who described her as a touchy and arrogant woman who had no qualms about contradicting her husband in public. Appearing in various expressions such as "Who does she think she is? Queen Taytu?" (Ma chi si crede di essere quella là, la regina Taitù?) or "She's like Princess Taytu," the latter being used to describe a woman considered too domineering towards her husband, and even appearing in children's books. Rumors began circulating in Italy that the Empress had castrated Italian soldiers killed or wounded after the Battle of Adwa. This obsession with Taytu perhaps explains why her name and image remain so prominent in the Italian collective imagination. In 1974, the Italian designer Emilio Bergamin even named a collection of tableware Taitù, which was still being produced in 2020.

== Bibliography ==
- Chris Prouty. Empress Taytu and Menilek II: Ethiopia 1883–1910. Trenton: The Red Sea Press, 1986. ISBN 0-932415-11-3

Taytu Betul House of Solomon Born: circa 1851 Died: 11 February 1918
Royal titles
Vacant Title last held by Dinqinesh Mercha	Empress consort of Ethiopia; 10 May 1889 – 12 December 1913	Seble Wongel Hailu (Never crowned) or Menen Asfaw
