= Alem Tsahai Iyasu =

Ethiopian princess (1916–2003)

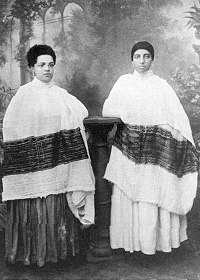
- Alem Tsahai Iyasu (left) with her mother
- Born: 22 February 1916; Ethiopian Empire
- Died: 14 April 2003 (aged 87)
- Father: Lij Iyasu
- Mother: Sabla Wangel Hailu

Alem Tsahai Worq Iyasu (Amharic: ዓለም ፀሐይ እያሱ; 22 February 1916 – 14 April 2003) was an Ethiopian princess.

== Biography ==
She was born in 1916 and was the only legitimate child of Lij Iyasu (uncrowned Emperor of Ethiopia from 1913 to 1916) and his official wife Sabla Wangel Hailu, a descendant of the House of Solomon. She was also Emperor Menelik II's only legitimate great-grandchild. Her parents divorced in 1916.

She was titled Emebethoi by Emperor Haile Selassie.

She firstly married Fitawrari Abebe Asfaw of Wollega in 1928, and they had a son, Lij Alem Seged Abebe. She secondly married Dejazmatch Assefa Demissew.
