= Seble Wongel =

Empress of Ethiopia and wife of Emperor Dawit II

- Itege

Empress of Ethiopia
- Tenure: pre-1518 – 1540

Dowager Empress
- Tenure: 1540–1563
- Predecessor: Na'od Mogasa
- Successor: Adimas Moas
- Born: Wenag Mogasa
- Died: 4 December 1567
- Husband: Lebna Dengel
- Issue: Gelawdewos; Yaqob; Menas; Amata-Giyorgis; Sabana-Giyorgis; Welette-Qiddusan; Taodra
- Mother: Yodit

Seble Wongel (Amharic: ሰብለ ወንጌል; died 4 December 1567) was Empress of Ethiopia through her marriage to Lebna Dengel. She is well-known as a key political and military figure during the Ethiopian–Adal War, as well as the reigns of her sons and grandson.

== Name ==
Seble Wongel is frequently confused with the 20th-century noblewoman, Sabla Wangel Hailu. To differentiate the two famous women, people sometimes refer to the earlier empress as Seble Wongel "Teleq" (the great) or "Kedamawit" (the first), while the modern figure is referred to with the suffixes Hailu, derived from her father's name, Dagmawit (the second), or Tinishi (the little).

== Life ==
Seble Wongel was from the Beta Israel nobility of Semien. and her mother was named Yodit which literally means "Jewess" or "Judith". Chronicles written in the 16th century imply that she was neither a member of the traditional nobility nor any group integrated with the Christian kingdom under the authority of the Ethiopian Emperor, meaning that her marriage was a major dynastic and political alliance. By contrast with previous emperors, Seble Wongel was the only wife, which won Lebna Dengel praise from contemporary Christian writers.

Popular tradition from the 18th century onwards holds that she came from Gojjam, though this association with the region may stem from the fact that she later settled there. The 20th-century record The Goggam Chronicle by Aleqa Tekle Iyesus suggests that Seble Wongel was a descendant of Ğara Šum from Enemay. While it is not clear if Seble Wongel actually came from Gojjam, it has been suggested that these later claims do not contradict 16th-century chronicles that record Seble Wongel as coming from outside the Ethiopian realm of direct control, as Gojjam enjoyed a high degree of autonomy at the time, and possibly not all of the area was Christian.

=== Ethiopian–Adal War ===
The reign of Lebna Dengel and his successor Gelawdewos were marked by wars between the Ethiopian Empire and the Muslim Adal Sultanate. From 1529 to 1543, the Adal swept through Ethiopian lands, leading almost to the destruction of the state. In 1539, Seble Wongel's mother was killed when the Adalites attacked the region, and the eldest of Seble Wongel's sons, Fiqtor, was killed in battle by the forces of Garad Uthman. The same year, another son, Menas was captured by Imam Ahmed.

According to the Portuguese chronicler Miguel de Castanhoso, Cristóvão da Gama first came across the Queen while she was on top of the mountain of Debre Dammo. The mountain was said to have been heavily fortified as Imam Ahmed attempted to capture it via siege the previous year, "not out of desire for the treasures that were in it, for there were none there and he knew it well, but to get the Queen into his hands, whom he much desired, as she is very beautiful." Castanhoso provided a further description of the Queen:

She was all covered to the ground with silk with a large flowing cloak, and some men bore a silk canopy that covered her and the mule to the ground, with an opening in front for her to see through. She was clothed in very thin white Indian cloth and a burnoose of black satin, with flowers and fringes of very fine gold, like a cloak her head dressed in the Portuguese manner, and so muffled in a very fine cloth that only her eyes could be seen.

Queen Seble Wongel advised against attacking at the Battle of Baçente, arguing that Gama should wait until her son Emperor Gelawdewos could march north from Shewa and join the Portuguese due to Ahmed Ibrahim having known of them. However, Gama was concerned that if he marched around this Muslim-held strongpoint, the local peasantry would be disappointed and stop providing supplies for his troops. The Portuguese pitched their camp the day before Palm Sunday prior to the Battle of Jarte, the queen arrived to their rear. She was placed in the center of the camp, which was properly arranged to await for the "Moors" as it occupied a hillock "near the stream of Afgol" (Afgol Ghiorghis, Tigray?), the best site on the plain. Imam, after seeing the outnumbered Christian forces, offered to allow Cristóvão da Gama and his Portuguese to return to their country as Seble Wongel had deceived him. Due to ever decreasing supplies and their opponents refusal to attack, Cristóvão da Gama arranged his forces with the queen at the center and, in the morning of Tuesday April 4, 1542, they began to march towards their enemy. The Adalites were defeated, with Ahmed himself gravely wounded, and Seble's Ethiopian forces reportedly slew the Moors "as if they had been sheep". While in pursuit, the Queen had a tent pitched, her and her women bandaging the wounded with their own headgear and crying tears of joy as they had been afraid. After the victory, Seble Wongel sent out spies in disguise.

In 1542, after their forces had fought and defeated the Muslim Ottoman-Adal army several times, the Portuguese suffering a defeat against a much larger force supported by thousands of Ottoman musketeers. After this, 120 Portuguese soldiers fled with Seble Wongel to the region of Tigray. Gelawdewos originally left Semien but rejoined his mother in October 1542. He then marched to Tigray and collected the remaining 120 Portuguese troops. Starting from 17 November 1542, Gelawdewos' combined Ethiopian-Portuguese forces defeated the Adal-Ottoman armies several times and killed several key leaders before finally killing Imam Ahmed and subsequently routing the Muslim army at the Wayna Daga on 21 February 1543. Imam Ahmed's wife, Bati del Wambara, escaped with 40 Turkish soldiers and 300 horsemen.

The eldest son of Bati del Wambara and Imam Ahmed was captured at Wayna Daga, and Seble Wongel used him to barter for the life of her son Menas, who had been held captive by the Adal for five years. Through her influence, as well as that of Bati del Wambara, a prisoner exchange was conducted, and Menas was returned to Ethiopia.

=== Menas' reign ===
Menas established the kingdom's base in the region of Mengiste Semayat, and Seble Wongel left with him in 1559. By 1563, Seble Wongel had made her official residence in this region at Kidane Mehret church.

== Family ==
- Husband: Lebna Dengel (1496 – 2 September 1540)
1. Fiqtor (d. 1539)
2. Yaqob (d. 1558)
  1. Fasilides
    1. Susenyos I (1572 – 17 September 1632)
  2. Lesana Krestos
    1. Za Dengel (d. 24 October 1604)
3. Menas (d. 1563)
  1. Sarsa Dengel (1550 – 4 October 1597)
4. Gelawdewos (c. 1521 – 23 March 1559)
5. Amata-Giyorgis
6. Sabana-Giyorgis
7. Welette-Qiddusan
8. Taodra, or possibly Theodora

== In popular culture ==
- Seble Wongel appears in Age of Empires III: Definitive Edition, in the historical battle "Christopher da Gama's Expedition" based on the Ethiopian-Adal War, incorrectly called Sabla Wengel in-game.
