= Hasib Ydlibi =

Syrian political advisor

Hasib Ydlibi (born 1866) was a rubber merchant and political advisor of Syrian and Circassian origins, probably born in the Ottoman Empire, who held significant roles in Ethiopia during the early twentieth century.

== Early life ==
According to a biography of Ydlibi by his daughter, he was born to a Syrian father and a Circassian mother who took him to Manchester, England, when he was aged six months. Other sources say he was born in Manchester. However, in the 1911 United Kingdom census, Ydlibi gave his place of birth as Beirut, then part of the Ottoman Empire.

Only two Ydlibi births were in fact registered in England in the 19th century: Zenab (1863, in Altrincham, Cheshire), and Ali Abdoullah (1871, in Chorlton, Lancashire). There were also two Ydlibi marriages: in 1847, Abdoullah Ydlibi or Ydlibe married Amelia James, in Chorlton, and her death is recorded in 1850; and in 1870 Ali Ydlibi was married in Salford. In 1848, an Ali Ydlibi, son of Abdoullah and Amelia, said to have been born in 1847, was baptized in Hulme, Manchester. In 1911, the brothers Azaat and Abdulgani Ydlibi, shippers of textile goods both born in Damascus, and reported to be Turkish, were recorded as living in Moss Side. All of these places are in and around Manchester.

== Career ==
In 1897 Ydlibi was employed as an interpreter in the service of the British Expeditionary Force in Sudan. After leaving the Force, he began trading gum in Kordofan, part of the newly acquired Anglo-Egyptian Sudan. In 1905 he visited Ethiopia as a representative of the Kordofan Trading Company, and during this trip he found rubber trees in the south of the country. The Emperor Menelik II subsequently granted him monopoly rights for the trading of the gum.

In April 1911, Ydlibi was living in New Malden, Surrey, and gave his occupation as “General merchant in Abyssinia and Sudan”. He had a wife, Julia, to whom he had been married for seventeen years, and three surviving children.

Ydlibi became a favoured confidante of Lij Iyasu, the effective ruler of Ethiopia from 1911 to 1916, and played a prominent role in helping Iyasu to implement administrative reforms in the country. Appointed as governor of Gambella and as Negadras of Dire Dawa and Harar, he was given free rein to reform both cities and charged with making Dire Dawa a model for all of Ethiopia. In particular, Lij Iyasu hoped to use Ydlibi's skills to introduce a system of government similar to that which the British had adopted in Cyprus, where Ydlibi had earlier worked.

Following the coup against Lij Iyasu in 1916, Ydlibi escaped to Djibouti. Out of favour with the new Ethiopian regime, he was refused re-entry to the country. With the First World War ongoing, the British later arrested Ydlibi in Djibouti on suspicion of being a Turkish agent, due to his role as a foreign policy advisor to Lij Iyasu earlier during the war. With his family, Ydlibi was detained in Djibouti and was later held in France.
