= Bati del Wambara =

Emira of the Sultanate of Harar

Emira of the Adal Sultanate
- Tenure: mid-16th century
- Husband: Imam Ahmad ibn Ibrahim (d. 1543); Emir Nur ibn Mujahid (m. 1552)
- Issue: Muhammad; Ahmad; A daughter
- Father: Mahfuz
- Religion: Islam

Bati del Wambara fl. 1559, (Harari: ባቲ ዲል ወንበረ, lit. victory is her seat) was the Harari wife of the 16th-century general, Ahmad ibn Ibrahim, and then his successor, Nur ibn Mujahid. She was extremely influential in shaping both her husbands' military policies in their campaigns against the Ethiopian Empire.

== Biography ==
Bati del Wambara was born the daughter of Mahfuz, Emir of Harar and later governor of Zeila. She married Imam Ahmad ibn Ibrahim al-Ghazi and accompanied him in his jihad to make Ethiopia a Muslim province.

Arab Faqih, the sixteenth-century Adalite author recounts an incident in which she resisted the pressures from the Adal army, who insisted that she refrain from joining them in their invasion of Abyssinia:

When the army reached Kub, they said to the Imām: ‘We will not accompany you to Abyssinia unless your wife Dəl Wämbära returns to the country of the Muslims. She shall not come with us to the country of the infidels. Not one of the Imāms ever took his wife with him [on campaign], only you.’ Ignoring the protests of Ahmäd’s soldiers, Dəl Wämbära imperiously replied: ‘I will not go back’. So her husband took her as far as Ifat in the land of the infidels.

During this expedition, she gave birth to two sons - Muhammad in 1531 and Ahmad in 1533. When her husband was killed and their eldest son captured by the forces of Emperor Gelawdewos (the son of Emperor Lebna Dengle), del Wambara successfully negotiated with the Dowager Empress Seble Wongel to exchange the captured brother of Gelawdewos for the boy. Del Wambara then fled to Harar with 40 soldiers and 300 horsemen.

In 1552, nearly 10 years after Imam ibn Ibrahim's death, she insisted that Nur ibn Mujahid eliminate the emperor of Ethiopia prior to their marriage. She is supposed to have pushed him into reviving the jihad in order to avenge the death of her deceased husband. In 1559, Nur ibn Mujahid's forces fought against the heavily outnumbered Emperor Gelawdewos in Fatagar, and the dead body of Ethiopian emperor was beheaded, reportedly on the order of del Wambara.
