= Georgios Prokopiou =

Greek war artist, photographer and documentary film maker

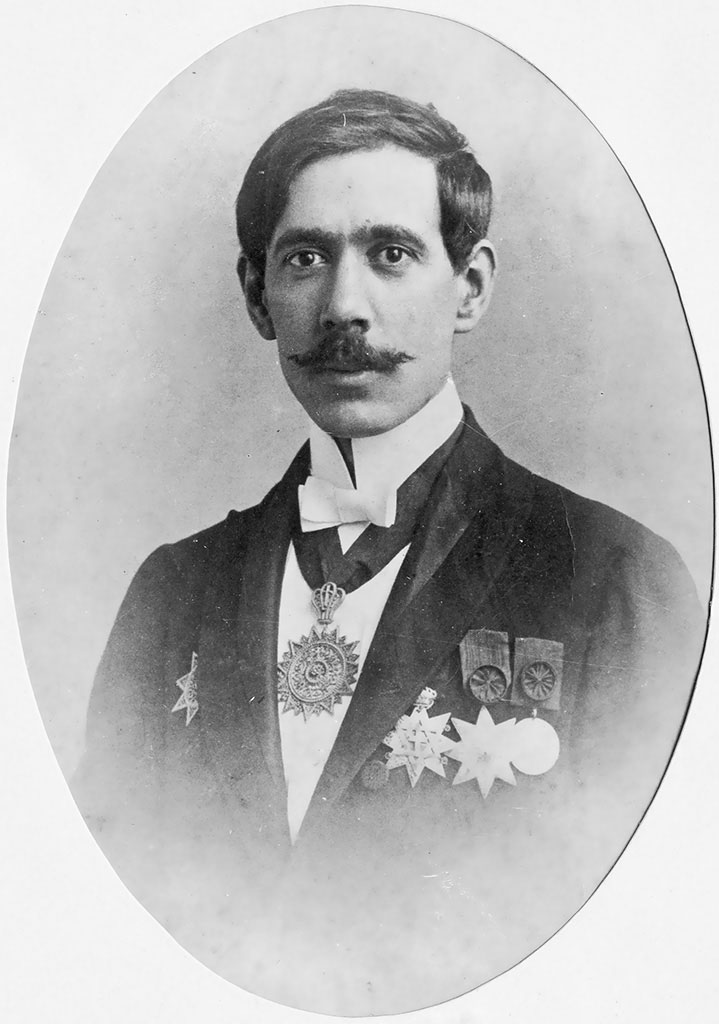
- Georgios Prokopiou (1907; perhaps a wedding picture)
- Born: Georgios Prokopiou; 1876; Smyrna, Ottoman Empire, (present day İzmir, Turkey)
- Died: 20 December 1940 (age 64); Tepelenë, (present day Tepelenë, Albania)
- Known for: Painting

Georgios Prokopiou (Greek: Γεώργιος Προκοπίου; 1876, in Smyrna – 20 December 1940, near Tepelenë) was a Greek war artist, photographer and documentary film maker. He also served as court painter to Emperor Menelik II and was a recipient of the Greek Military Cross.

== Biography ==
At the age of fifteen he was working as an icon painter and attracted the attention of Hortense Wood, an English artist who was living near Smyrna. She gave him drawing lessons and presented his work to Nikiforos Lytras, who recommended Prokopiou to the Athens School of Fine Arts. He enrolled there in 1895, studying with Lytras and Georgios Roilos. In 1901, after completing his studies, he returned to Smyrna and held his first exhibition. Two years later, he travelled to Alexandria and Cairo, where he painted portraits of notable figures in the Greek communities there, including Pavlos Melas, who introduced him to the head of Ethiopia's diplomatic mission.

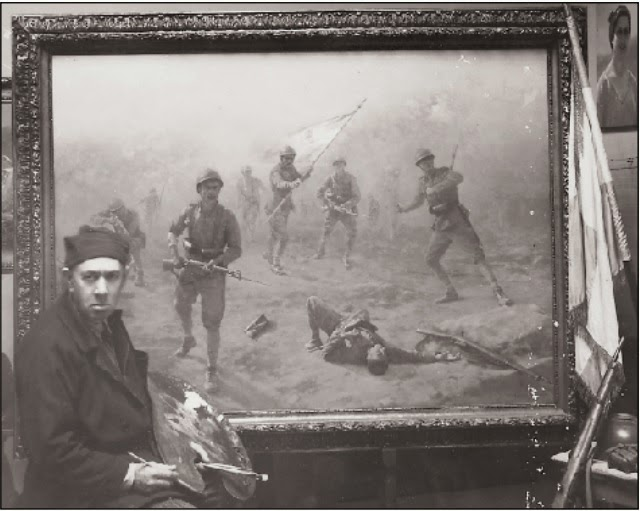
Prokopiou in his studio (late 1920s)

This resulted in an invitation to visit Addis Ababa to do a portrait of Emperor Menelik. He went there by caravan from Djibouti, accompanied by his brother Socrates, who would later write a book about the trip. After competing with several other painters, he was chosen to become the Court Painter in 1905. In addition to painting the Royal Family, he portrayed several ambassadors as well as landscapes and village scenes. Lavish with honors, the Emperor awarded him the Order of Solomon, the Order of the Star of Ethiopia and other lesser-known medals.

In 1907, he returned to Athens to marry, travelled extensively, and settled in Smyrna in 1913. The beginning of World War I found Smyrna blockaded by the Allies. Soon after, the Ottomans began persecuting Christians. This included setting up "labor battalions" which were soon revealed as actually being death battalions. Most of the Greek population, including Prokopiou and his family, went into hiding. Somehow, he found work as an art teacher for the daughter of an Ottoman official, which afforded him protection. It was at this time that he created his first war art; depictions of the campaign in the Dardanelles.

=== Greco-Turkish and Greco-Italian Wars ===
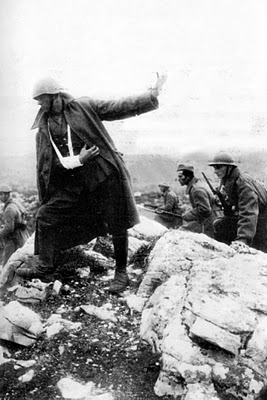
Greek attack on the Albanian front (1940)

After the war, Smyrna came under Greek control. The following year, General Leonidas Paraskevopoulos commissioned him to produce paintings, photographs and films of the Greek campaigns against the Turks during the Greco-Turkish War. Although they admired his courage, a few commanders complained that his activities interfered with military operations. After the Turkish recapture of Smyrna, he returned home and remained to take photographs of the Great Fire.

When the chaos had subsided, he was arrested and sentenced to death by a Turkish tribunal. Luckily, the prison commandant allowed him to say goodbye to his family. With the assistance of his neighbors and the French Consul, he and his family were able to escape aboard a French ship that took them to Piraeus. In 1925, he settled in Athens. He continued to paint military scenes from memory until 1928, after which he produced a variety of nudes, scenes of ruins and portraits, including one of Haile Selassie, who visited his studio shortly before becoming Emperor.

In 1940, the Greco-Italian War began when Greece refused to capitulate to the Axis powers. Although Prokopiou was sixty-four years old and ill with bronchitis, he went to the War Ministry, begging to be sent to the front. Finally, he wrote to Prime Minister Metaxas, saying that he was ashamed to stay at home when his two sons were out fighting for Greece. Metaxas agreed to his request, and Prokopiou left for Albania to join the Greek counter-offensive. He met up with his son, Angelos, sketching and taking photographs almost immediately. One night, several weeks later, when the temperature fell below zero, he died of heart failure. He was given the posthumous rank of Colonel, brought back to Athens, and buried with full military honors.

== Selected paintings ==
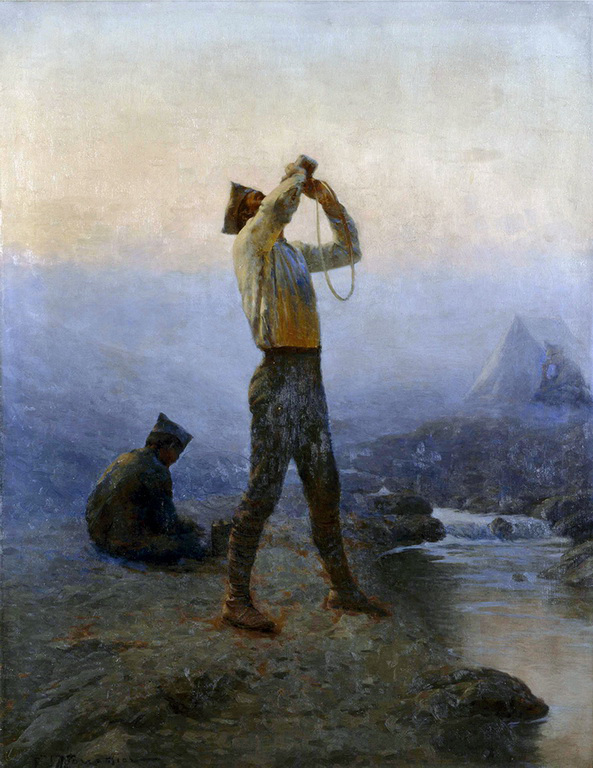
Soldier drinking water

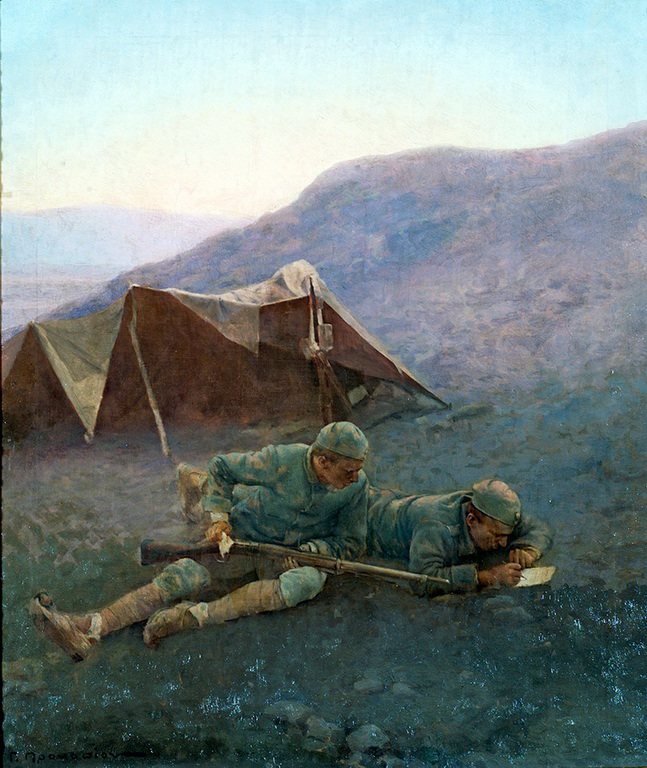
Resting from battle

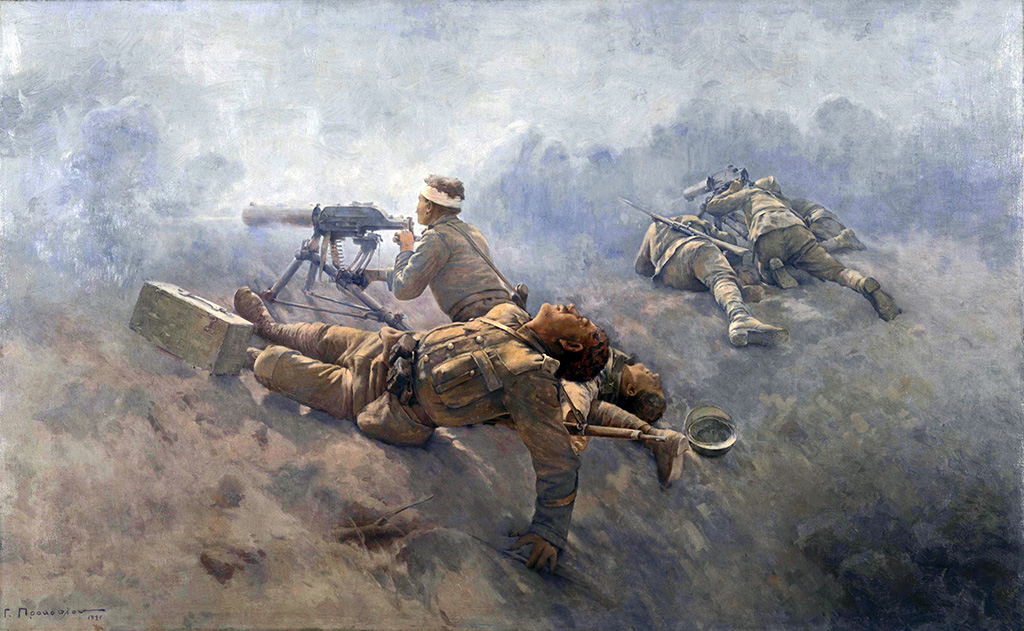
To the Last Man

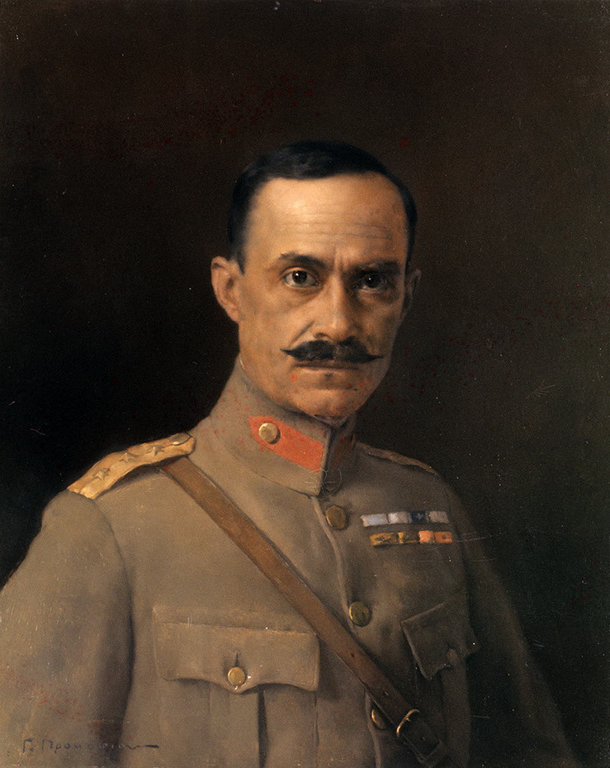
Nikolaos Plastiras

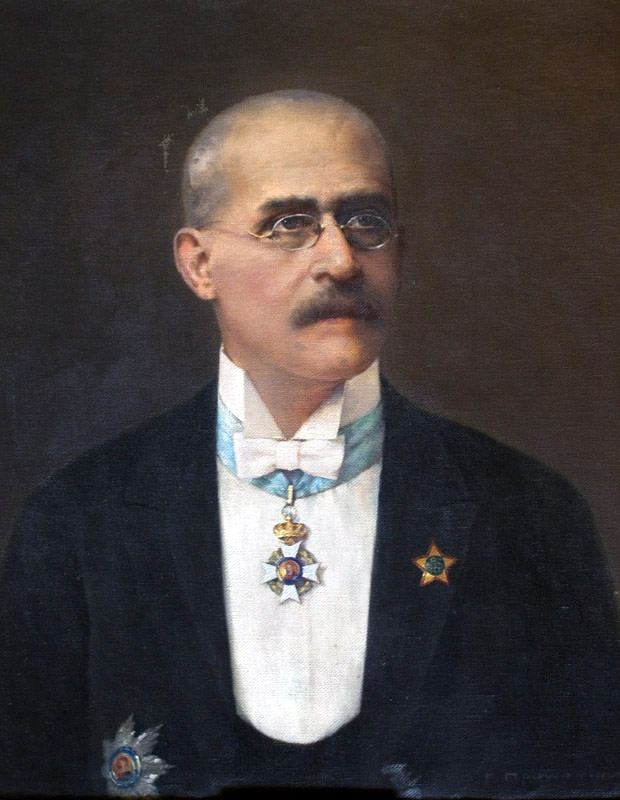
Spyridon Lambros

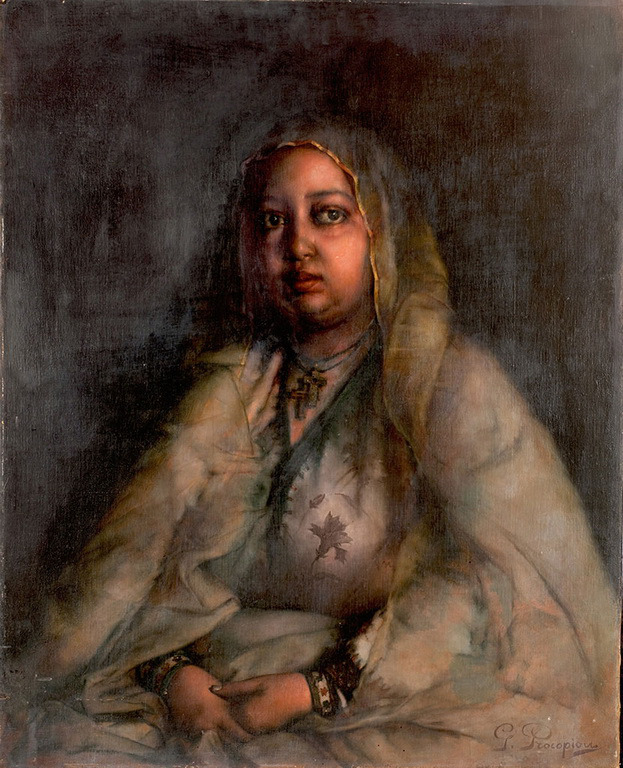
Ethiopian Empress
Taytu Betul
