= Nur ibn Mujahid =

Nur ibn Mujahid نور بن مجاهد
- Emir of Adal; Emir of Harar; Amir al-Mu'minin
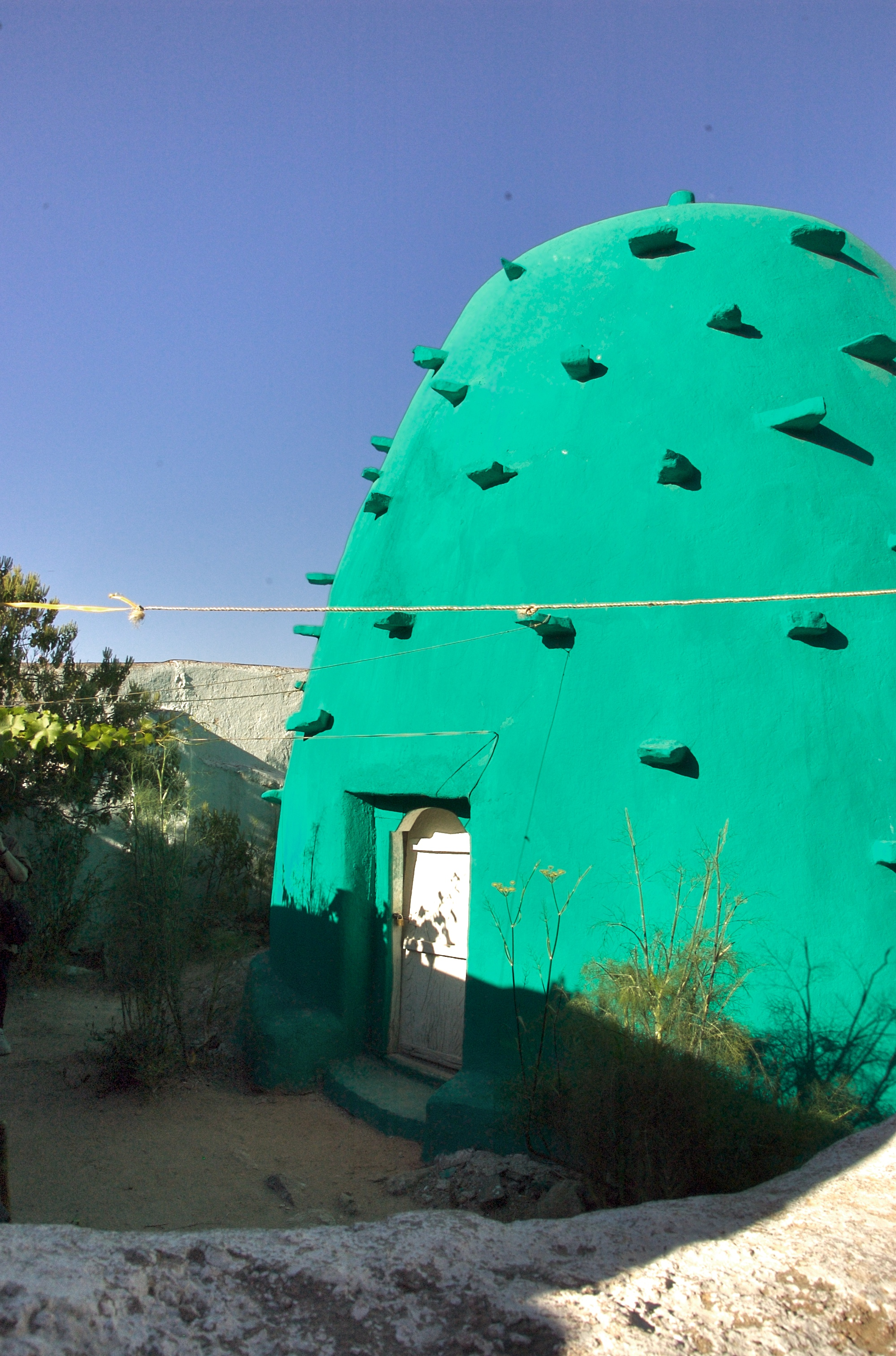
- Tomb of Nur ibn Mujahid in Harar

Leader of Adal
- Reign: 1550–1567
- Predecessor: Ahmad ibn Ibrahim al-Ghazi
- Successor: Uthman the Abyssinian
- Died: 1567; Harar, Adal Sultanate
- Spouse: Bati del Wambara
Names
- Imam of the Pious; Master of the Second Conquest; The Second Conquerer; Annihilator of the Infidels; Prince of the Believers; Commander of the Faithful
- Religion: Islam

Nur al-Din or Nur ibn Mujahid ibn ‘Ali ibn ‘Abdullah al Dhuhi Suha (Harari: ኑር ኢብን ሙጃሂድ, Somali: Nuur ibn Mujaahid, Arabic: نور بن مجاهد; died 1567) was an Emir of Harar who ruled over the Adal Sultanate. He was known for his victory in Fatagar against Ethiopian forces and for marrying his uncle's widow, Bati del Wambara. He succeeded Imam Ahmad Ibn Ibrahim as the leader of the Muslim forces against Christian Ethiopia by defeating the Emperor Galewdewos in battle in 1559. He is often cited as the "King of Adel" in medieval texts.

== Biography ==
Nur ibn Mujahid was the son of Wazir Mujahid ibn 'Ali ibn 'Abdallah ad-Duhi Suha, one of the cavalry commanders of Imam Ahmad ibn Ibrahim al-Ghazi who himself was the son of Garad Ali who was from a well established noble family. Mujahid married Ahmad's sister, from which marriage Nur was born. Harari oral tradition regard Nur Ibn Mujahid as an ethnic Somali and Mohammed Hassen states Nur's father was a chief of the Harari people. According to several oral traditions recorded by Enrico Cerulli, Nur ibn Mujahid was Somali and hailed from the Marehan sub-clan of the greater Darod clan. The Royal Chronicle of Gelawdewos' considered Nur to be "from the tribe of the Suhawyan", which according to Solomon Gebreyes Beyene could be the name of an Afar or Somali subclan.

When Imam Ahmad ibn Ibrahim al-Ghazi, who had led the Muslim conquest of the Ethiopian Highlands, was killed in 1543, the Muslim forces fell back in confusion to Adal. The dead leader's widow, Bati del Wambara, undertook to renew the fortunes of the Kingdom. She inspired her people to take revenge and the Adalites, believing that they Abyssinians were vulnerable, invaded the highlands in 1548. This ended in catastrophe when they were repulsed by Gelawdewos's vassal, Fanu'el, and Gelawdewos later arrived in the region upon where he ravaged the country for five months.

Bati del Wambara the de facto leader of Adal would stipulate to Nur a commander of Zeila that she would only marry him if he killed Gelawdewos. Nur would thus depart on a jihad (holy war) to the eastern Ethiopian lowlands of Bale and Dawaro. This venture was unsuccessful, Nur was defeated and the Abyssinians then advanced into Adalite territory. However, this defeat was not mortal and Adal soon recovered.

In 1559, Nur once again took the offensive and invaded Fatagar. Gelawdewos, who was in Gojjam, sent his cousin Hamalmal to Harar hoping to force the Muslims back. But Nur held on, hoping to deal the Abyssinians a decisive blow in their own country. Hamalmal was able to enter Harar without any significant resistance, capturing and executing Sultan Barakat ibn Umar Din. In the meantime, Gelawdewos, with a larger army attacked Nur with smaller army . Gelawdewos was defeated and killed by Nur at the Battle of Fatagar. Following this victory, Nur crossed over into Wej province to loot the palace and the capital of the deceased emperor before promptly returning to his country. Pankhurst stated the death of Gelawdewos had caused Christian military power in the area to crumble. Nur then severed the monarch's head and despatched it with him triumphantly, to the "Country of Sa'ad ad-Din", Gelawdewos's head was then displayed in harar for numerous weeks. Abyssinia was ‘devastatingly defeated; Pankhurst stated the death of Gelawdewos had caused Christian military power in the area to crumble. Paez mentions that after Nur’s victory before his men could celebrate he replied;

I had not achieved that victory through my own strength, but that God, no less, had given it to me.

Despite this victory, the following years were very difficult for Harar. The Oromos who had been migrating north invaded the Adal Sultanate and annihilated Nur's army at the Battle of Hazalo following his victory at Fatagar over the Abyssinians. The invasion was accompanied by carnage on an appalling scale and according to Bahrey, there had been "no such slaughter since the Oromo first invaded". This was followed by a mass migration which sent different groups fleeing from their ancestral homes.

The severed head of Gelawdewos was nevertheless successfully brought to Harar where it was put on display for the people to witness. Nur was promoted to Emir, upon marrying Ahmad ibn Ibrahim al-Ghazi's widow, Bati del Wambara. He would be acknowledged by the citizens of Harar, and the widow of Ahmed as the leader of Adal. Contemporary Harari records describes Nur as a very religious ruler who abstained from every act forbidden by the Sharia and likewise wanted his people to follow his example in their lives, explicitly prohibiting un-Islamic behavior among the nobility.

Most of the Muslim population fled to the walled city of Harar. The Oromos then occupied and settled on the lands of the Hararghe highlands which had been abandoned by the local population. After the Oromos had settled in the surrounding countryside of Harar, the city experienced a severe famine. J. Spencer Trimingham narrates "Emir Nur exerted every effort to help his people to recover, but after every respite the Oromo would again descend like locusts and scourge the country, and Nur himself eventually died of the pestilence which spread during the famine."

== Legacy ==
Some historians consider Nur as the last witness and protagonist of Islamic greatness in the Horn of Africa. In fact a later Harari Arabic poem praising Nur says: "The city of Harar sparkles with holy men; and, especially with the rightful Imam of the pious. Well deserved she is, to draw the hems of her raiment, 'cause he who has built her, is the annihilator of the infidels." Harari documents from the time also give him the prestigious title of Amir al-Mu‟minin.

According to archaeologist Timothy Insoll, the shrine dedicated to Nur, situated in Harar, is attributed to the period spanning from the seventeenth century through the nineteenth century.

== See also ==
- Adal Sultanate
- Ahmad ibn Ibrahim al-Ghazi
- Ethiopian–Adal War
