= Gazo =

Gazo may refer to:

== People ==
- Gazo (rapper) (born 1994), French rapper
- Gazo Chinard (1230–1294), Italian noble lord
- Eddie Gazo (born 1950), Nicaraguan boxer
- Francesco Gazo (born 1992), Italian footballer

== Other uses ==
- Gazu (also known as Gazo), a village in Khash County, Sistan and Baluchistan Province, Iran
- Beth Gazo (literary the house of treasure), a Syriac liturgical book that contains a collection of Syriac chants and melodies
- Gazo traditional music of Togo (havé).

== See also ==
- Gazeau
- Gaso (disambiguation)
- GazoPa, a former image search engine
