= Semera =

Capital of Afar Region, Ethiopia

Samara Samara
- Capital city
- Samara
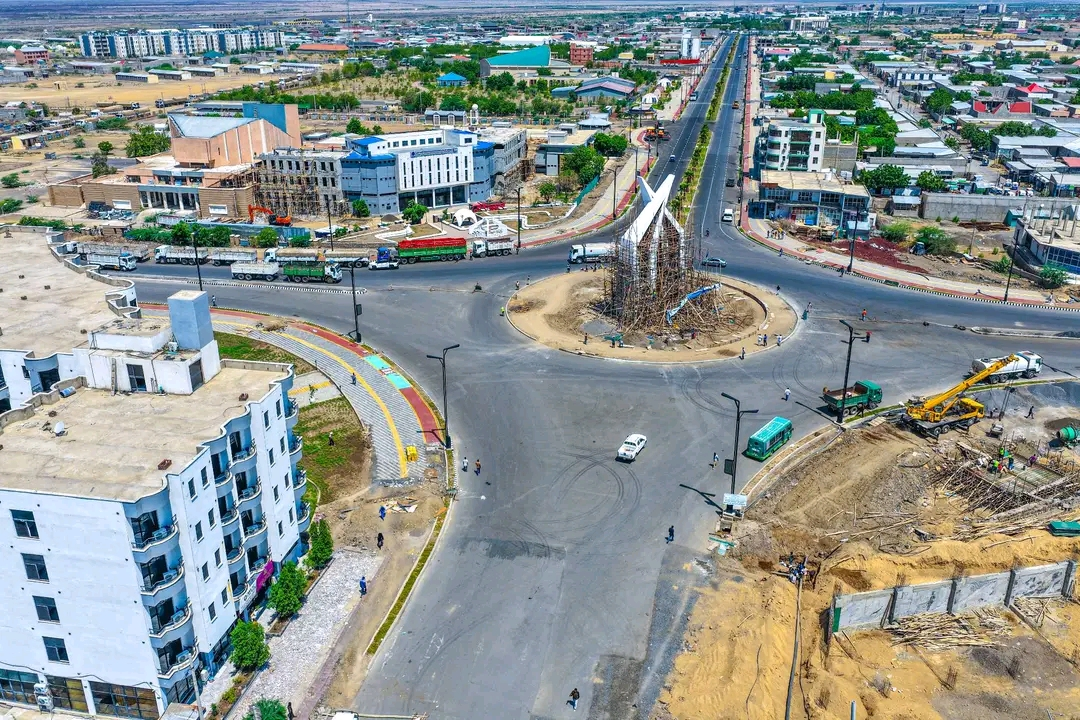
- Samara Square

- Location within Ethiopia Location within the Horn of Africa Location within Africa
- Coordinates: 11°47′32″N 41°0′31″E
- Country: Ethiopia
- Region: (Afar Region) Afar
- Zone: Administrative Zone 1

Government
  - Type: City administration
  - Mayor: Abdu Musa
- Elevation: 432 m (1,417 ft)

Population (2010)
  - Capital city: 10,000
  - Urban: 50,000
- Time zone: UTC+3 (EAT)
- Postal code: 7260
- Climate: BWh

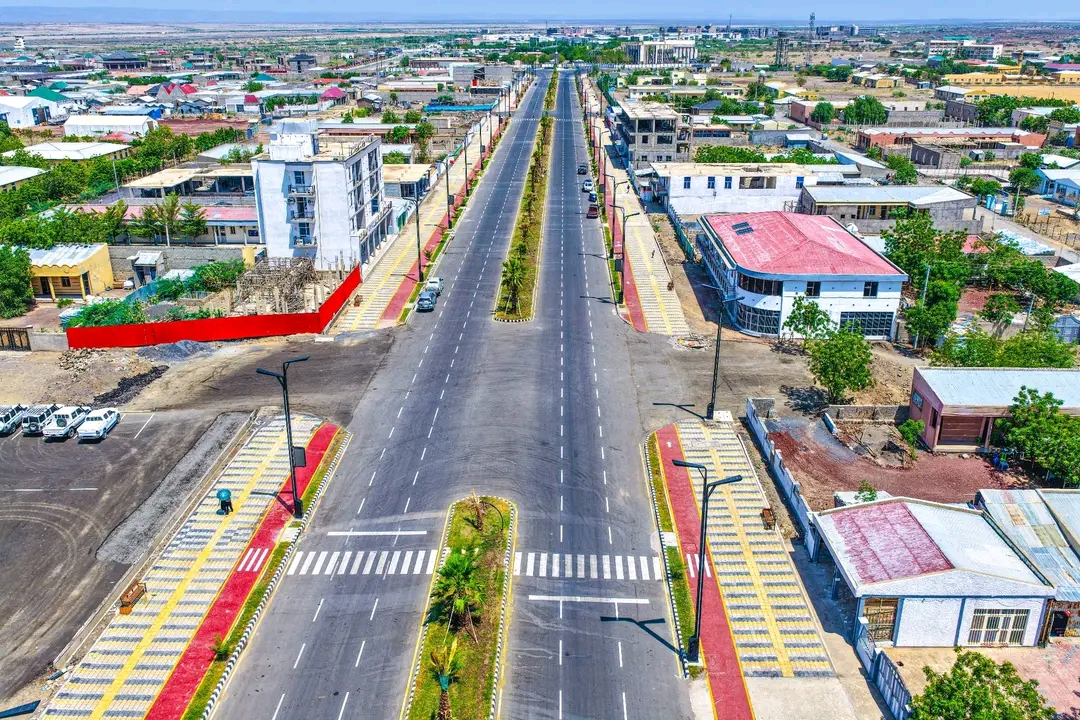
Samara

Samara (Afar: Samara; Amharic: ሰመራ) is the capital of Afar Region, Ethiopia. It is a town on the Awash–Assab highway in north-east Ethiopia, having been planned and built to replace Asaita. Located in Administrative Zone 1, Samara has a latitude and longitude of 11°47′32″N 41°0′31″E. One of the completed buildings is Samara University, which began holding classes in 2007.

The 2006 Lonely Planet guide to Ethiopia had this description of Samara:

With its quirky mix of barracks, modern apartment blocks, and soulless administrative buildings, it looks like a microscopic version of Brasília emerging incongruously in the middle of the desert – except that it's a completely botched attempt at creating a new town.

The 2009 Lonely Planet guide omitted the final phrase following the dash. The 2002 edition of Ethiopia: the Bradt travel guide described Semera as consisting of "one active filling station (complete with fridge) and a cluster of modern offices and tall apartment blocks in various states of construction – all in mad isolation from any existing settlement!"

The area is served by Sultan Ali Mirah Airport, which has scheduled service to Addis Ababa.

== History ==
Radio Ethiopia reported that the inaugural meeting of the Afar Regional Council was held in Semera on 20 July 1995. Six days later, the Council decided to make Semera its capital city and Amharic its temporary working language. The three top officials would be President Alimirah Hanfare, Vice-president Osman Ainet and Secretary Mohammed Seid; the Regional president at the time, Habib Alimirah, was not present.

The Eighth meeting of the Afar Regional Council was held in Semera 4–5 March 2009, and items scheduled to be discussed included a bill to eliminate female genital mutilation in the Region.

== Demographics ==
The town had a population of 2,625 in 2007. It is one of five towns in Dubti woreda.

== Climate ==
Semera has a hot desert climate (BWh) in the Köppen-Geiger system.

Climate data for Semera, Ethiopia
Month	Jan	Feb	Mar	Apr	May	Jun	Jul	Aug	Sep	Oct	Nov	Dec	Year
Record high °C (°F)	44.4 (111.9)	41.0 (105.8)	42.6 (108.7)	44.4 (111.9)	47.0 (116.6)	47.0 (116.6)	45.6 (114.1)	45.0 (113.0)	45.0 (113.0)	42.2 (108.0)	41.0 (105.8)	38.5 (101.3)	47.0 (116.6)
Mean daily maximum °C (°F)	32.8 (91.0)	34.6 (94.3)	37.2 (99.0)	39.3 (102.7)	41.3 (106.3)	43.3 (109.9)	41.9 (107.4)	39.6 (103.3)	40.4 (104.7)	38.2 (100.8)	35.5 (95.9)	33.4 (92.1)	38.1 (100.6)
Daily mean °C (°F)	26.0 (78.8)	27.3 (81.1)	29.8 (85.6)	32.1 (89.8)	34.4 (93.9)	35.8 (96.4)	34.6 (94.3)	32.2 (90.0)	33.2 (91.8)	31.1 (88.0)	28.6 (83.5)	26.4 (79.5)	31.0 (87.7)
Mean daily minimum °C (°F)	19.1 (66.4)	20.0 (68.0)	22.5 (72.5)	24.9 (76.8)	27.5 (81.5)	28.4 (83.1)	27.3 (81.1)	24.9 (76.8)	26.1 (79.0)	24.0 (75.2)	21.8 (71.2)	19.4 (66.9)	23.8 (74.9)
Record low °C (°F)	12.0 (53.6)	12.6 (54.7)	14.0 (57.2)	14.8 (58.6)	20.1 (68.2)	16.5 (61.7)	13.7 (56.7)	15.4 (59.7)	16.3 (61.3)	14.6 (58.3)	14.4 (57.9)	12.0 (53.6)	12.0 (53.6)
Average precipitation mm (inches)	0.5 (0.02)	6.8 (0.27)	16.9 (0.67)	29.7 (1.17)	12.0 (0.47)	6.2 (0.24)	26.0 (1.02)	84.6 (3.33)	18.9 (0.74)	3.9 (0.15)	1.5 (0.06)	1.5 (0.06)	208.5 (8.2)
Source: Ethiopian Meteorological Institute
