= Imamate of Aussa =

Former sovereign state in Ethiopia

- 1577–1734
- Flag shown next to the Aussa area on MS. Douce 391
- Status: Sovereign State
- Capital: Aussa
- Common languages: Arabic; Harla/Harari; Somali; Afar
- Religion: Islam
- Imam
  - ?–1734: Selman (last)
- Historical era: Early modern period
  - Established: 1577
  - Emirate of Harar splits from Imamate: 1647
  - Disestablished: 1734
Preceded by	Succeeded by
Adal Sultanate	Sultanate of Aussa; Emirate of Harar
- Today part of: Ethiopia; Djibouti

The Imamate of Aussa, also spelled Imamate of Awsa, was an early-modern Sunni Muslim imamate in present-day eastern Ethiopia and north-western Djibouti. Muhammad Gasa established the seat of power to Aussa from Harar in 1577, as the latter was too exposed to Oromo invasions. Internal strife arose from conflicts between the Harla and Arab factions. A Harar faction split from the Imamate in 1647 forming their own independent emirate. The 17th century saw the inclusion of upland Harla and Doba populations playing a pivotal role in the establishment of the Aussa Sultanate. The state was disestablished in 1734 and in 1769, the Mudaito dynasty successfully overthrew the Kabirto of Harla.

== Origin ==
Harar which had held the position of the capital for 58 years between 1519 and 1576, was too exposed to the frequent Oromo attacks and as a result, lost its strategic importance. Consequently, the new Imamate decided to relocate its capital to Aussa, which was more defensible and provided a more secure location to govern from. This decision was made in light of the challenging circumstances that the Imamate was facing and the need for a capital that could withstand external threats. As a result, Aussa became the new seat of power and played a critical role in the history and development of the Imamate. After the transfer of the government seat to Aussa by Imam Muhammad Gasa, from the month of Jumad al-Akhirah of the year 1576 onwards, the region came under the rule of a representative of the Imam of Aussa. This marked a significant change in the political structure of the region and the beginning of a new era of governance.

Aussa in the late 16th century Arabic text of Harar "Taʾrīkh al-mulūk" was stated to be occupied by the Adalite holding the title Hegano and had already become a breeding ground for those opposing the rulers of the Harar-based Adal Sultanate. Several historians state the imamate was of Harari origin.

== Internal conflict ==
This polity was marred with internal conflicts between the Harla and the imams. The Dardöra imams who had established themselves in Aussa alongside the Harla already established in the region was then followed by other allies and supporters of Imam Muhammad Gasa in 1585. Their arrival in the region created tension with the Dardōra and with the Harla already established in the region. The Harla who had already established themselves in Aussa came into conflict with the nomadic Afars who surrounded Aussa. An Arabic chronicle reports that only 8 years after the transfer of the capital to Aussa, they began to raid one of the major caravan routes. This led to fierce fighting in which 10 noblemen were killed.

The established Harla were in permanent disunity, while the sedentary Awsimára were torn between allegiance and resistance. Around 1628–1636, Ahmad Yäwwi, chief of the Harla, restructured the land system by tracing the boundaries of the fields. This led to tensions between the imams and the sedentary locals, including the Harla, who became the landowners (known as baddá-h abbá). However, the stages that led to the expansion of the Debné and We'ima to the west and south of the oasis, as well as the Mödaytó to the north, remain not completely known. It is believed that this expansion was favored by the Harla, who were in search of external support in their struggle against the imams.

With the help of the Mudaito, the Harla burnt the residence of Imam Salmän in Handág, which is believed to be located in Wablé Fánta, at the confluence of the Nangaltá and Afal-Gedé. The imam died in 1750, and Salmän is reputed to be the last imam of Gara. His successor was the ancestor of the Dúrussó fraction, Mahammad "Düs" (around 1750–1760), who became the first Harla "Sultan" of Awsa and was referred to as "Rais" in Arab chronicles. According to Heloise Mercier, the inhabitants of Harar who had migrated to Aussa were unable to maintain their customs and dialect contrary to those who lingered in Harar. In the 17th century the induction of upland populations of Harla and Doba into Afar identity would lead to the emergence of the Aussa Sultanate.

== Collapse ==
The Kabirto of Harla who originated from the Walasma dynasty were overthrown in 1769 by the Mudaito dynasty of Afar. The descendant of Kabirto Shaykh Kabir Hamza, preserved their history through manuscripts. Italian scholar Enrico Cerulli asserts that although Aussa became dominated by the Afar people, the ancient Semitic speaking Muslim kingdom survived in the form of the Emirate of Harar past the 18th century.

== Imams of Aussa ==
	Name	Reign	Note
1	Imām Maḥamed "Gāsa" Ibrahim	1577–1583	A relative of Imām Aḥmed Gurēy, he moved the capital to Awsa and appointed his brother (also named Maḥamed) to be Wazir of Harar. Gasa's chamberlain was Abdullah al-Habashi and his assistant was Kabir Hamid b. Ibrahim al-Jandabali. He was killed in battle with the Warra Daya in 1583. Upon his death his brother who had remained in Harar took the throne in 1583 however he would also move to Aussa shortly after.
2	Imām Maḥamed "Gāsa" Ibrahim II	1584–1589	Brother of Imām Maḥamed "Gāsa" Ibrahim, his chamberlain Zulal b. Abdallah al-Hassani briefly seized the throne in 1583 however with the assistance of the governor of Bale Abbas b. Kabir Muhammad, Gasa II would eventually defeat Zulal and became imam of Aussa. Abbas b. Kabir Muhammad would however himself rebel leading to Gasa II receiving considerable support from the Harla people and occupying Zeila ousting Abbas Kabir. The Afar people would raid the state in this period.
3	Imām Ṣabraddīn Ādam	1589–1613	Grandson of Imām Maḥamed "Gāsa" Ibrahim
4	Imām Ṣadiq Ṣabraddīn	1613–1632	Son of Imām Ṣabraddīn Ādam
5	Malāq Ādam Ṣadiq	1632–1646	Son of Imām Ṣadiq Ṣabraddīn.
6	Imām Aḥmed Abrām	1646–1647	Grandson of Imām Ṣadiq Ṣabraddīn, Nephew of Malāq Ādam Ṣadiq.
7	Imām ʿUmardīn Ādam	1647–1672	Son of Malāq Ādam Ṣadiq, his Imamate was destroyed by the Mudaito Afars and Harlas.

== Wazirs of Harar ==
	Name	Reign	Note
1	Emir Saʿadaddīn Ibrahim	1585–1620	First Wazir of Harar to call themselves "Emir" thus solidifying the autonomy of Harar. He was the brother of Imām Maḥamed "Gāsa" Ibrahim. A few years later after receiving this position, he concurrentely also became the Imam of Aussa
2	Emir Ṣabraddīn Ādam	1620–1625	Succeeds Saʿadaddīn Maḥamed
3	Emir Ṣadiq Ṣabraddīn	1625–1646	Succeeds his father Ṣabraddīn Ādam
4	Emir Malāq Ādam Ṣadiq	1646–1646	Succeeded his father Ṣadiq Ṣabraddīn, he ruled for 11 months before being killed.
5	Emir Aḥmed Abrām	1646–1647	Succeeded Malāq Ādam, he was the son of Wazir Abrām, ruling for 10 days after which he died from drinking a potion.
6	Emir Ali bin Da'ud	1647–1647	Succeeds Aḥmed Abrām. Secedes from the Imamate of Aussa to establish the Emirate of Harar.

== Family tree ==
Family tree

Muhammad; Gasa; Imam of Aussa r. 1577-1583
Sa'd al-Din; Muhammad; Imam of Aussa r. 1584-1589	Adam; Muhammad
Sabr al-Din; Adam; Imam of Aussa r. 1589-1613
Sadiq; Sabr al-Din; Imam of Aussa r. 1613-1632
Adam Sadiq; Imam of Aussa r. 1632-1646	Abram Sadiq
Umar al-Din; Adam; Imam of Aussa r. 1647-1672	Ahmad Abram; Imam of Aussa r. 1646-1647

== See also ==
- Aussa Sultanate
- Mudaito dynasty
- Sultanate of Ifat
- Emirate of Harar
- Harla people
