= Kabir (teacher) =

Harari title and teacher

Kabir (Harari: ከቢር) (sometimes spelled kabeer) is an honorific title in the Harari language. It commonly designates a Muslim scholar or a teacher. Enrico Cerulli states the term is of Ethiopian Semitic origin.

== History ==
In the early sixteenth century texts, the companions of the leaders of Adal Sultanate; Abun Adashe and Ahmed ibn Ibrahim al-Ghazi were stated to be Kabirs. During Adal's invasion of Abyssinia, an individual described as the pious scholar Kabir Abūn b. Aḥmad al-Ǧanāsirī was responsible for the Adalite treasury. The Adalite Kabirs were actively engaged in proselytization efforts throughout the conflicts against Abyssinia. Sixteenth century writer Arab Faqīh describes an occurrence related to the conversion of the Abyssinian province of Šuğara, wherein the Kabir requests for a segment of the army to return due to concerns that the new converts may forsake their faith:

Immediately, Kabir Muhammad, the muezzin of the imam, stood up and addressed the Muslims, ‘You have put your best effort into marching against Bet Amhara. But the people of this region of Sajara that we have left behind us have already become Muslims. There is no need for all of us to march away, leaving Sajara without anybody. We came to you. I and Samsu, without leaving anybody remaining in the region. At least one of us should now return to it, for if it is left in a vacuum, its people will apostatise.'

Photo of Quran manuscript from Harar by Haji Khalifa ibn Kabir Hamid in 1708

A son of a Kabir named Abbas briefly ruled the Imamate of Aussa in 1585. According to the Afar locals in Afambo, a Harari Muslim scholar by the name of Kabir Hamza arrived in the region and introduced the Hanafi legal school to Aussa. His descendants today are known as "Kabirtu" and identify as Harla. Kabirtu in Afar trace their lineage to the Walasma dynasty. Kabīr Ḥamza b. Kabīr Maḥmūd b. Kabīr ʿAlī al-Ḥarallī al-Awsī al-Ḥanafī a Harla clan affiliate was known as the scholar of Aussa in the 19th century.

During the mid-1600s, the Yemeni ambassador al-Ḥaymī, traveling in Abyssinia encountered religious scholars known as Kabirs in eastern Tigray, who asserted their descent from Kabir Salih. The nisba al-Kabiri has persisted to the present day, linked to notable religious families within the Tigre and Saho communities. In the early 1700s, the Kabirs of the Emirate of Harar, Talha and Abdarrahman are mentioned as the nobility in attendance to an assembly called by Emīr Ṭalḥa ibn ʿAbdullah.

Early 19th century Emirate of Harar records indicate that the Kabir households of Harar were also known as traders who dedicated a portion of their time to locations such as Ifat in Abyssinia. British explorer Richard Burton, who sojourned in Harar around the mid-19th century, references Kabirs Khalil and Yonis, recognized as the prominent religious leaders in the Emirate of Harar. As stated by philologist Muna Abubeker, the educational institution for aspiring scholars in Harar was known as the Kabir Gar (house of Kabir).

In the 1900s, a local Kabir aided French archaeologists Père Azaïs and Roger Chambard in their efforts to locate the ruins of the lost Harla city of Derbiga in eastern Hararghe (modern Somali Region of Ethiopia). The death of Kabir Ali Sheikh in 1993, the sole remaining bookbinder in Harar, marked the end of the region's long-standing bookbinding tradition.

== Notables ==
People with the title include:

- Kabir Khalil, scholar in the Emirate of Harar
- Kabir Muhammad, Muezzin of Ahmed ibn Ibrahim al-Ghazi
- Kabir Ibrahim, Muezzin of Abun Adashe
- Kabir Hamid, ancestor of the Wolane people
- Kabir Abdulmuhaymin Abdulnasser, contemporary Harari scholar
- Kabir Hassan, Qallu missionary

== See also ==
- Garad
- Malak
- Abdulkadir Kebire
- Murad Abdulhadi
