= Gaso =

Gaso may refer to:

- Gåsö, an island in the Swedish province Bohuslän
- GASO, an abbreviation for Georgia Southern University
- Gasó, another name for Rosarigasino, a rhyming slang language game traditionally associated with the city of Rosario, Argentina
- Gaso, another name for Kwosso, a ball game played by the Afar people

== See also ==
- Gašo Knežević (born 1953), a Serbian law scholar
