= Werner Munzinger =

Swiss administrator and explorer

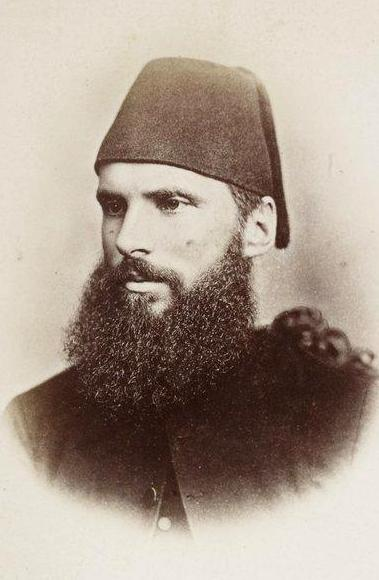
Werner Munzinger, 1873

Werner Munzinger (4 April 1832 in Olten, Switzerland – 14 November 1875 in Aussa, Sultanate of Aussa) was a Swiss adventurer and administrator under the service of the Khedivate of Egypt.

== Life and career ==
He was born in Olten, and studied science and history at the University of Bern, then later took courses in Oriental studies at the Ludwig-Maximilians-Universität München and the Sorbonne. He was the son of Josef Munzinger, member of the Swiss Federal Council.

In 1852, Munzinger arrived at Cairo, where he spent a year improving his Arabic. Entering a French mercantile house, he led a trading expedition to various parts of the Red Sea. Until 1855 he served as French consul at Massawa, when he moved to Keren where he spent the next six years exploring the lands of the Bogos. In 1861, Munzinger joined Theodor von Heuglin in an attempt to explore Central Africa, but separated from him in November, proceeding along the Gash and Atbara to Khartoum. There he succeeded von Heuglin as leader of the expedition, and travelled in 1862 to Kordofan, but failed to reach Darfur and Wadai.

After a short stay in Europe in 1863, Munzinger returned to the north and north-east borderlands of Ethiopia. In 1865 Munzinger managed the British consulate along the border of Ethiopia, but remained in Massawa, after the 1868 British invasion of Ethiopia, where he became the French consul. There, according to Augustus B. Wylde, he married a woman of Hamasien and convinced one of the local warlords, Wolde Mikael, to cede the province of Hamasien to France. Munzinger sailed to France, and by early 1870 had an expedition ready at Toulon to sail to Massawa when the Franco-Prussian War broke out, and French resources were diverted to this higher priority, whereupon he left the service of the French. In July of that year he was sent to Aden, where he joined Captain S.B. Miles on an expedition into the interior of the southern Arabian Peninsula. He then left the French and entered the service of the Egyptian government of Khedive Ismail, serving as governor of the Keren region and Massawa (modern-day Eritrea). Once he reached his command, his first act was to place the Bogos once again under Egyptian rule and significantly develop the port of Massawa.

During the Egyptian-Ethiopian War, Munzinger was selected to command a small expedition intended to open up communication with Menelik II, king of Shewa, a potential ally of Egypt. In late 1875, he led an Egyptian force of 350 men from the port of Tadjoura towards Ankober with the objective of joining forces with Menelik. He planned to cross through the Danakil Desert and enter the Ethiopian Highlands through the Awash Valley. However on the night of November 14, warriors of the Afar and Issa tribes attacked the Egyptian force on the outskirts of Aussa. This resulted in the massacre of Munzinger, his wife, their child, and most of the Egyptian soldiers. Only a few survivors managed to escape to back to Tadjoura. This defeat marked the end of the expansionist aspirations at the expense of the Christian empire.

== Writings ==
Munzinger published the following works:

- Über die Sitten und das Recht der Bogos (1859)
- Ostafrikanische Studien (1864; 2nd ed., 1883)
- Die deutsche Expedition in Ostafrika (1865)
- Vocabulaire de la langue de Tigré (1865)

He wrote numerous geographical papers, and a memoir on the northern highlands of modern-day Ethiopia and Eritrea for the Zeitschrift für allgemeine Erdkunde, new series, volume 3.
