= Gazeau =

Gazeau is a French surname. Notable people with the surname include:

- Jean-Pierre Gazeau (born 1945), French mathematician and physicist
- Sylvie Gazeau (born 1950), French violinist
