= Jean-Pierre Gazeau =

French physicist and mathematician

- Born: 10 October 1945 (age 80); Marvejols, Lozère, France
- Scientific career
- Fields: theoretical physics, mathematics
- Workplaces: Université Paris Cité Centro Brasileiro de Pesquisas Físicas - CBPF Laboratoire de physique mathématique du CRM
- Thesis: [ Nature algébrique de l'opérateur sturmien associé à l'équation de Schrödinger : extension de certains résultats à la théorie des représentations finies de GL(n, C) et de U(n) (polynômes à treillis de Gel'fand)] (1978)
- Doctoral advisor: Yvonne Héno
- Website: https://apc.u-paris.fr/APC_CS/en/users/gazeau

Jean-Pierre Gazeau (born 10 October 1945) is a French physicist and mathematician who works in the field of symmetry in quantum physics. His research has focused on coherent states; beta numeration for quasicrystals, and more generally for aperiodic order; and de Sitter space and anti-de Sitter space times. He is a professor emeritus at Paris Diderot University, Sorbonne Paris Cité University (group).Through a career spanning 50 years, he has held research and teaching positions on five continents, with a particular concentration on developing and emerging countries.

== Education ==
Gazeau graduated in applied mathematics from the University of Paris Faculty of Sciences in 1967. He earned his doctorate in science at the University Paris 6 (Pierre-et-Marie Curie) in 1978.

== Career ==
Gazeau is the author "Coherent States in Quantum Physics" (2009). He is the co-author of "Coherent States, Wavelets and Their Generalizations", initially published in 2000 with a revised edition in 2014.At Paris Diderot University, Gazeau served as vice president for communication from 1992-1997. Under Gazeau's initiative, supported by several colleagues, the university in 1994 held an event – Denis Diderot Days – to explore the philosopher's work and impact. The theme was "The transmission of academic knowledge through the book". The events were held under the patronage of French President François Mitterrand and sponsored by the Minister of Culture and Francophonie, the Minister of Higher Education and Research, the Chancellor of Universities and the Office of Paris Mayor Jacques Chirac.

Gazeau is affiliated with top scientific institutions in France: the Astroparticle and Cosmology Laboratory; the National Centre for Space Studies CNES; the Paris Observatory; and the National Center of Scientific Research. In Brazil, he is affiliated with the Brazilian Center for Research in Physics (CPBF).

He has served as a visiting researcher in the United States, Canada, Japan and several European countries outside of France. In addition, he has served as a visiting researcher in Brazil; at Chern Institute of Mathematics at Nankai University in Tianjin, China; and at the Institute for Research in Fundamental Sciences in Tehran, Iran He also has been a visiting professor in Algeria, Bangladesh, Benin, Burundi, Morocco and Nicaragua.

=== Influential students ===
Among early-career scientists who have studied for their doctoral degrees under Gazeau, several have gone on to distinguished careers:

Romain Murenzi, executive director of TWAS, He got his PhD iat the Université Catholique de Louvain-La-Neuve (Belgium) under the supervision of Jean-Pierre Antoine (for the main thesis) and Jean-Pierre Gazeau (for the second thesis)

Mathematician Jacques Renaud was appointed in 2016 to a five-year term directing Espé, the Higher School of Teaching and Education of the Academy of Versailles.

Simon Labrunie, an associate professor at the University of Lorraine in France, is co-author of "Mathematical Foundations of Computational Electromagnetism" (Springer, 2018).

== Non-scientific work ==
Gazeau's niece, Sophie Toscan du Plantier, was murdered in Ireland in December 1996. In 2007 the case remained unsolved, and Gazeau formed an association to focus attention on the crime and to press for continued investigation. Gazeau is the president of the Association for the Truth about the Murder of Sophie Toscan du Plantier née Bouniol. British journalist Ian Bailey was arrested twice in relation to the murder, but maintained his innocence. On 31 May 2019 Bailey was convicted of murder in absentia by the Cour d'Assises de Paris and sentenced to 25 years in prison. Based on the verdict, France is seeking to extradite him from Ireland. In June 2019, the French court ordered Bailey to pay €115,000 to reimburse the French agency that compensated the victim's family.
