= Afar Liberation Front =

Political party in Ethiopia

- Abbreviation: ALF
- Founded: 1975
- Dissolved: 1999
- Succeeded by: Afar National Democratic Party
- Ideology: Afar interests Monarchism
- National affiliation: Afar National Democratic Party (1999–2000)
- Colors: Blue, White, Green
- Seats in the House of Federation: 0 / 112
- Seats in the House of Peoples' Representatives: 0 / 547

Party flag

The Afar Liberation Front (abbreviated ALF) was an Afar political party and former militant group in Ethiopia. It fought the communist Derg government and the People's Democratic Republic of Ethiopia from 1975 to 1991. After the Ethiopian Civil War ended in 1991, the ALF continued to promote Afar interests in the country peacefully.

== History ==
In June 1975, the Derg attempted to arrest the Afar Sultan, Ras Alimirah Hanfadhe, an action which led to a pitched battle in Asayita, home of Ras Alimirah, that left both Derg soldiers and Afar loyalists killed or wounded, and sent the Sultan and his son Hanfadhe Alimirah fleeing from Ethiopia. With their departure the Afar rose in revolt, burning the Tendaho Plantation and killing many non-Afar in the area around Asayita, as well as closing the highway that linked the Red Sea port of Assab with the rest of the country, bringing a halt to the Ethiopian economy. Gasoline was rationed in the capital city, Addis Ababa, for the first time. The Derg responded by devastating Asayita, and slaughtering innocent and guilty Afars indiscriminately. Despite this vicious response, Ras Alimirah and his son had been watching developments in Ethiopia, and had prepared accordingly by secretly sending a number of students to Somalia for training in guerrilla warfare. By the time the Sultan fled Ethiopia, these trained followers became the core of the Afar Liberation Front, who led the Afar fight against the Derg.

The Afar were not the only group in active revolt against the Derg regime, and the widespread ethnic unrest led the Derg to respond by announcing the Program for the National Democratic Revolution in April 1976. This would recognize the rights of ethnic groups who had suffered under the Haile Sellassie regime, and hopefully to solve the "national question" once and for all. In April of the following year the Derg met with representatives of the Afar National Liberation Movement (ANLM) in Gewane at an Afar congress. Afterwards a number of ANLM members were appointed to local administrative positions, which weakened both the ALF's military activity and political influence amongst the Afar.

Following the fall of the Derg, Ras Alimirah Hanfadhe returned to Asaita with his son. Over the following years, the ALF was able to elect its members to the Presidency of the new Afar Region, first Habib Alimirah, and then Alimirah Hanfadhe. However the Ethiopian People's Revolutionary Democratic Front (EPRDF) was not happy about its alliance with the ALF due to its conservative ideology, the ALF’s apparently lavish expenditure of the regional budget, its undisguised favor towards the Aussa area for economic development, and the intrigues of the various members of the Alimirah family with regional players. (Sarah Vaughan notes that "at the outbreak of the Ethio-Eritrean conflict it was reported that one of the sultan’s sons favoured the Eritreans, and another the Ethiopians.") Yet the EPRDF did not want to align with the ANLM due to its association with the hated Derg, so it fostered the creation of a third political organization, the Afar People's Democratic Organization (APDO), which won control of the Afar Region and 3 of the Regions 8 seats in the House of Peoples' Representatives from the ALF in the 1995 general elections.

Following the election, on 8 November 1995 EPRDF troops surrounded their family residence in Assayita, then after exchanging gunfire overpowered Alimirah's guards, and entered the residence, where they confiscated weapons and other items. According to observers, this action against the Sultan and the ALF was another effort to reduce his influence in the Afar Region. Despite the EPRDF's persistent efforts to bring the group under its control, the ALF is said to have remained independent.

It is reported that in the latter half of 1999 the ALF and the APDO merged with three other Afar political parties – the Afar National Liberation Front, the Afar Revolutionary Democratic Unity Front and the Afar National Democratic Movement – to create a new party called the Afar National Democratic Party. Despite this announcement, Radio Ethiopia reported on 25 September 2000 that the leader of the ALF, Sultan Alimireh Hanfareh, had returned from exile to meet with Prime Minister Meles Zenawi to discuss political, economic and social issues affecting the Afar region.

== See also ==
- Afar Insurgency
- Second Afar Insurgency
- Afar Democratic State
