= Sheikh Madar =

19th-century Somali Sufi leader

Madar Ahmed Shirwac مدر احمد شروع
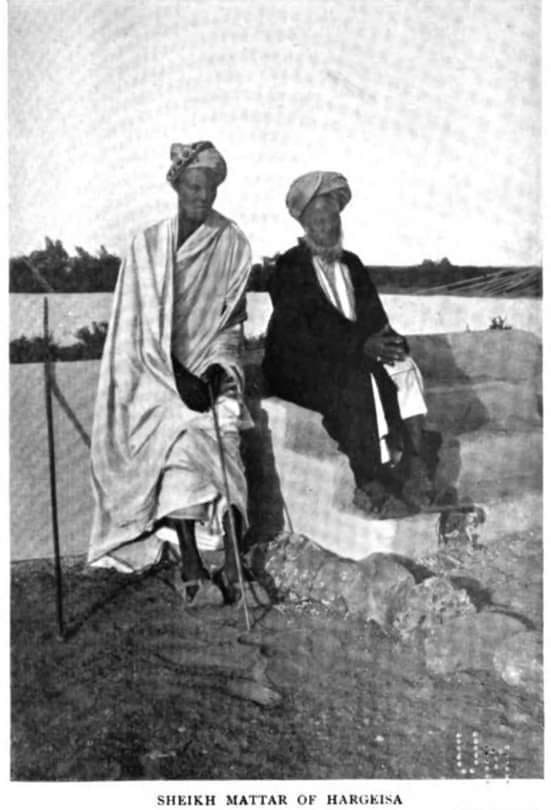
- Sheikh Madar pictured in Hargeisa
- Title: Sheikh

Personal life
- Born: 1825 Hadayta
- Died: 1918 Hargeisa, British Somaliland
- Resting place: Hargeisa, Somaliland
- Children: Yusuf Madar, Ali Madar, Omar Madar, Haji Abdillahi
- Era: Modern Islamic period
- Region: British Somaliland, Emirate of Harar / Harar
- Main interest(s): Sufism, Social Reformer, Cultivation

Religious life
- Religion: Islam
- Denomination: Sunni
- Jurisprudence: Shafi'i
- Tariqa: Qadiriyya order
- Creed: Ash'ari

Muslim leader
- Influenced by: Abdul Qadir Gilani, Abadir Umar ar-Rida, Kabir Khalil (teacher)
- Influenced: Sheikh Yusuf Madar, Sheikh Omar Madar, Ali Madar

Madar Ahmed Shirwac, better known as Sheikh Madar (Somali: Sheekh Madar; 1825–1918) was a 19th-century Somali political/religious leader, a social reformer, merchant and a jurist who is known as the founder of Hargeisa. He hailed from the Yunis Nuh division of the wider Sa'ad Muse Habr Awal Isaaq clan. His tomb is now a venerated Sufi shrine in the city.

== Biography ==
=== Early life ===
Born into a wealthy mercantile family in Berbera, Madar was sponsored by his father to study religion for 20 years in Harar. Harar was the centre of Islamic learning in the Horn, and a very familiar city for his Habr Awal clan which controlled the lucrative caravan trade stretching to Berbera with strong ties with the Emirate of Harar. Upon the completion of his studies Sheikh Kabir Khalil one of the three top ulema in Harar advised him to establish a Qadiriyya tariqa commune in present-day Hargeisa.

=== Move to Hargeisa ===
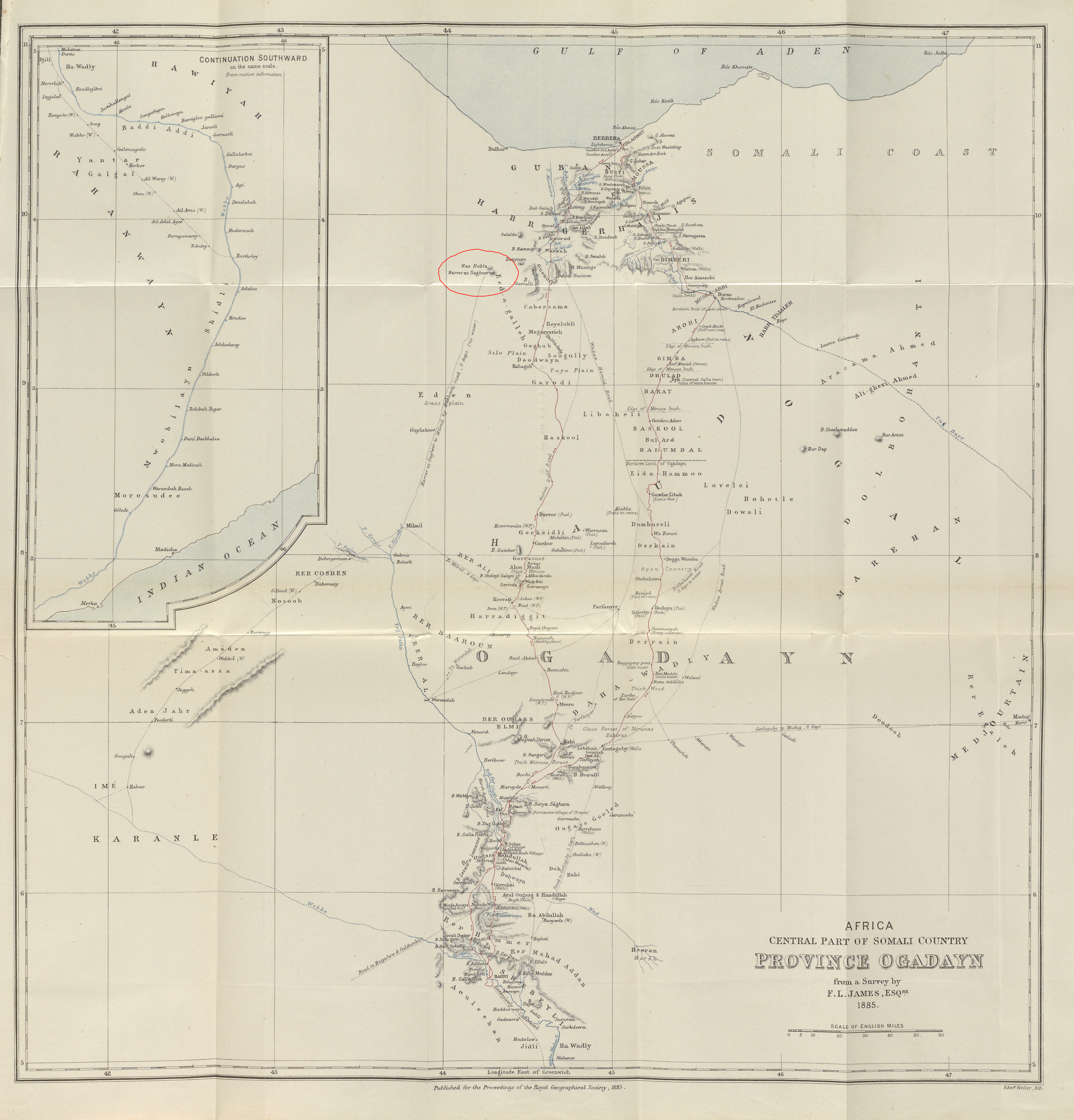
Hargeisa circled and the surrounding region in 1885

In the mid 19th century Hargeisa and the surrounding region was a hotbed of clan strife with raids being made on caravans attempting to pass through. Madar alongside other Sufi sheikhs established the Jama'a Weyn or the big congregation in Hargeisa. The new congregation adhered to the 900 year old Qadiriyya order established by renowned Shaykh Abdul Qadir Gilani and introduced new practices that would put Hargeisa on the trajectory to becoming the largest Somali city in Somaliland and the second largest Somali inhabited city to date. Hargeisa and its environs had suitable soil and ample water supply for agriculture yet the pastoralists had not been taking advantage of this fact. Madar alongside the other leaders of Jam'a Weyn introduced the cultivation of sorghum and the new construction of permanent housing and creating his grand mosque in 1883. The Sheikh was also responsible for leading the communal prayers supplicating to Allah for rain in a ritual known as roobdoon.

The Jama'a formed a nucleus that attracted other pastoralists to come and settle in the burgeoning town. As well, clan conflicts were mitigated as the new community had managed to unify on a shared religious identity rather than aligning strictly on traditional clan basis. With the Sheikh succeeding in the task delegated to him by his master Sheikh Kabir. Religious leaders in the Jama'a took it upon themselves to place the disabled in the region under their care.

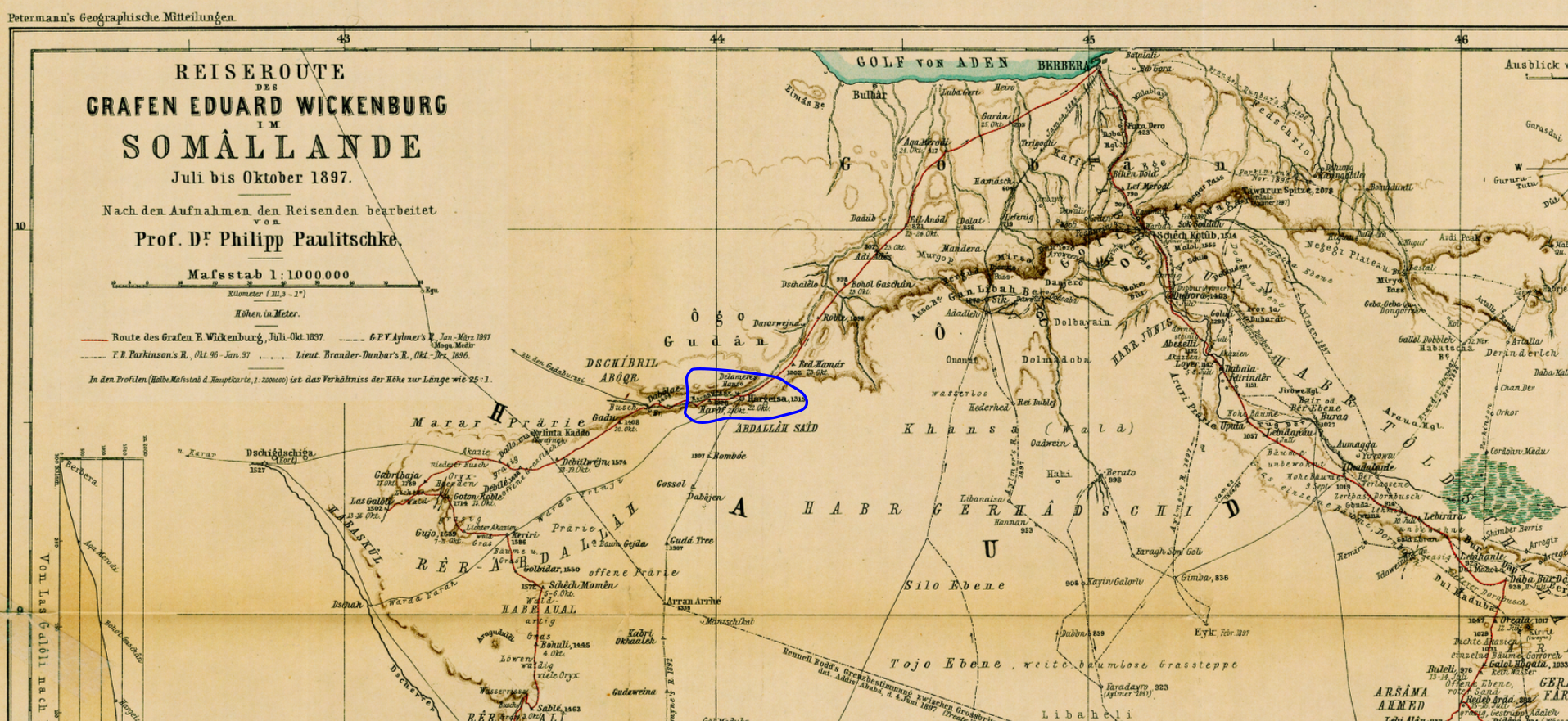
Paulitschke's map covering critical trade routes in 1898

=== Berbera debates ===
In Berbera the established Qadiriyya tariqa would soon be challenged by a new tariqa. The most prominent Sheikh of the Salihiyya order was Mohammed Abdullah Hassan who arrived in Berbera in 1895 and constructed his own masjid and began propagating. He was strongly against khat and chewing tobacco, both of which the Qadiriyya had permitted. Amongst other disputes he would come to debate the leading Qadiriyya sheikhs of Berbera including Aw Gaas and Xaaji Ibrahim Xirsi. Sheikh Madar the leader of Somali Qadiriyya was invited to participate in 1897 and after rigorous discussion, the Qadiriyya tariqa had proved victorious and Mahmud Abdalla Hassan had been refuted. British authorities took note of the disturbance and turmoil and he was thus expelled from the city. The divisions were deep and both sides had accused the other of heresy, Mahmud Abdalla Hassan would go on to form the Dervish movement based on Salihiyya just two years after the debates partly in rebuke of the Qadiriyya status quo.

=== Influence & anti Ethiopian efforts ===
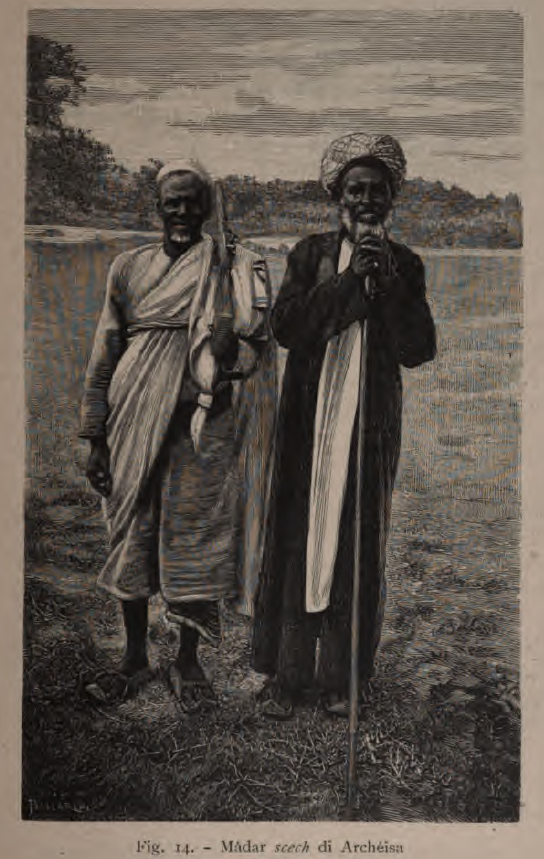
Sheikh Madar of Hargeisa with a bodyguard in 1895

As a respected elder and influential peacemaker Sheikh Madar held considerable sway over the Habr Awal clan and this leverage was recognized by the British Parliament in the face of the Salihiyya Dervish Movement which had severely disrupted the trade of British Somaliland. The protectorate was required to raise its own revenues to cover expenses and trade being halted or crippled was a massive blow to stability in the region.

In the 1901 Parliamentary Sessional Report Madar's influence is discussed

Sheikh Madar the head of the religious community here is entirely on the side of law and order and exerts considerable influence over the Habr Awal tribes in this direction, one and all of whom are opposed to the Mullah's faction

Reports are now current that the Mullah will move towards Odweina. At Hargaisa Sheikh Madar is collecting the Aidagalleh and Habr Awal tribes to oppose his advances in that direction. Sheikh can command a sufficient following to safeguard Hargaisa, and I should say that the Mullah will not attempt to penetrate so far west.

As well, the quickly expanding Ethiopian Empire had taken large swathes of new territory around the turn of the century and tribes just outside the protectorate were cowed to pay tribute to General Ras Makonnen. His forces threatened Hargeisa itself and coerced tribes to leave British protection. Sheikh Madar alongside other traditional leaders organized the scouting alongside protectorate authorities to gain advanced warning of potentially devastating attack. Fortunately, Makonnen was checked and the raid did not materialize.

== Legacy ==
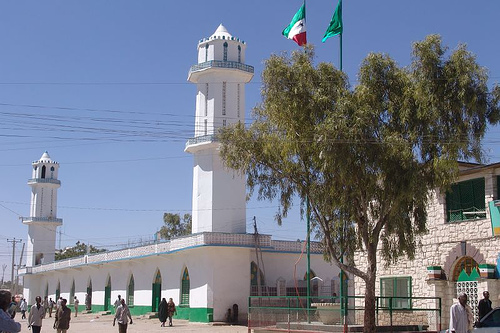
Historic Jama'a Masjid of Hargeisa, built on the site where Sheikh Madar's first commune was located

Following Madar's death in 1918 his son Yusuf followed in his footsteps and became a respected Sheikh in his own right. However, His other son Ali Sh Madar Ahmed chose to become an entrepreneur and become a successful and wealthy entrepreneur with the blessing of his father Sheikh Madar. At a later years. Ali Sheikh Madar's son Sh Yussuf Ali Sheikh Madar later become the 2nd Chairman of SNM and was a scholar and teacher and the first Foreign Minister of Somaliland. Sh Yusuf's son Ibrahim Yusuf Madar, also a Sheikh, would go on to be the lead mediator in the grass roots reconciliation process of the northern clans following the Somali Civil War at the Borama Conference. Ibrahim ensured adequate clan representation to truly create a lasting peace in Somaliland.

Hargeisa has grown to become a vibrant cultural hub and is the current capital of Somaliland. The eponymously named neighborhood of Sheikh Madar today in Hargeisa is one of the oldest in the city and the site of the original jama'a falls in the area. Sheikh Madar's introductions and reforms left behind a lasting effect that continues into the present day. He introduced permanent settlements, reforming a nomadic life based on following after the rains and pastures. Secondly, he brought together members of various clans in an affiliation of brotherhood and directed his followers toward agriculture, changing the culture of nomadic pastoralism and as well as the culture based on single clan loyalty. The impact of Sheikh Madar's introduction of agriculture can be seen in the agricultural firms in the area west of Hargeisa, Gabiley and Borama districts.

== See also ==
- Sheikh Ibrahim Sheikh Yusuf Sheikh Madar's grandson and former Guurti leader
- Kabir Khalil Sheikh Madar's teacher
- Sultan Deria Hassan, Grand Sultan of the Isaaq clan
- Harald George Carlos Swayne British officer & author of Seventeen Trips to Somaliland who photographed Sheikh Madar
- Mohammed Abdullah Hassan leader of the Dervish movement and prominent Salihiyya Sheikh who was opposed to Qadiriyya and debated Madar
- Hargeisa the setting of most of Madar's adult life
- Sheikh Uways Al-Barawi leading Qadiriyya scholar from Barawa and fiercely anti-Salihiyya, architect of the Benadir revolt
- Harar, the city where he studied and became versed in religion
