= Muhammad Gasa =

Muhammad Gasa محمد قاسا
- 1st Imam of the Imamate of Aussa
- Reign: 1577–1583
- Predecessor: Mansur ibn Muhammad
- Died: 1583
- Religion: Sunni Islam

Muhammad Gasa (Arabic: محمد قاسا) (died 1583) was the first Imam of the Imamate of Aussa. Muhammad Gasa abandoned the capital of Harar and relocated his capital to the desert oasis of Aussa. He subsequently became the first ruler and founder of the new Imamate of Aussa.

== History ==
Muhammad Gasa, a relative of Ahmad ibn Ibrahim al-Ghazi and Nur ibn Mujahid, was elected imam on September 1577. Hararis hoped that Muhammed, because of his illustrious lineage, he would create a new sense of unity, and inspire them to resist within the walls, if not lead them to victory outside of them. To their disappointment, the first thing Muhammed did when he came to power was to transfer the capital from Harar to Aussa in the Afar desert. Muhammad thought that this new capital would be less accessible to Oromo raids, but it did not appear to be that secure as the Oromos continually raided it anyways. In 1583 Muhammad was killed while in battle with the Warra Daya Oromos. His death was followed by a succession crisis in which eight imams succeeded each other in less than five years.
