= Mudaito dynasty =

Sultanate of Aussa dynasty

The Mudaito dynasty (Modaytó dynasty) is the ruling dynasty of the Sultanate of Aussa (Sultanate of Awsa) in Ethiopia. It was founded by the Asaihemara Modaito clan of the Afars who came from the La'o and Doobi areas.

== History ==
The Sultanate of Aussa (Afar Sultanate) succeeded the earlier Imamate of Aussa. The latter polity had come into existence in 1577, when Muhammad Gasa moved his capital from Harar to Aussa (Asaita) with the split of the Adal Sultanate into the Imamate of Aussa and Emirate of Harar. At some point after 1672, Aussa declined and temporarily came to an end in conjunction with Imam Umar Din bin Adam's recorded ascension to the throne. On 26 September 1725, the Mudaito Afars and their Harla allies invaded Aussa from the North-east Eli Da'ar and central-west of Andhar Kalu and burnt the state of Awsa. They began Modaito expansion through Dobi and Kalo by ransacking Adali settlements. The following month they defeated Imam Salman's soldiers, killing 200 Imamate soldiers. By 1734, Kedafo prevailed as Amoyta over the imamate and established the Mudaito dynasty. The primary symbol of the sultan was a silver baton, which was considered to have magical properties.

In June 1764, the Mudaito extended their area of control by overpowering Imamate tribes in and around Awsa. In July 1809, Amir Mahammad bin A'as Ali confronted the Mudaito to avenge his father's killing in Awsa but failed. In the following years, The Mudaito unleashed heavy blows against the pro-Imamate warriors of Adali Debne We'ima when the powerful Adals tried to halt Mudaito advance. In 1814, the Mudaito invaded Tadjourah, the capital of Adali Dardars, killing Adali rulers and destroying homes. This shaped the power struggle in Afar history in favour of Mudaito's rule which allowed the expansion of Mudaito's Awsa Sultanate lasting up until the colonial reorganisation in 1936.

== Rulers ==
The following is a list of Mudaito dynasty rulers (Amoyta).

Name	Lifespan	Reign start	Reign end	Notes	Family	Image
Kadhafo: Afar: Kaxxafo		1734	1749			
Kadhafo Mahammad ibn Kadhafo		1749	1779			
Aydahis ibn Kadhafo Mahammad		1779	1801			
"Asa" Aydahis ibn Mahammad ibn Aydahis: Afar: "Qasa" Aydacis Macammad		1801	1832	First official Amoyta		
Hanfere ibn Aydahis: Afar: Canfaxe Aydacis		1832	1862			
Mahammad "Illalta" ibn Hanfere: Afar: Macammad "Illalta" Canfaxe		1862	1902	Won the battle of Arraddo against Menelik II in 1896.		
Mahammad ibn Aydahis ibn Hanfere: Afar: Macammad Aydacis		1902	c. 1910	Starting from 1902, the governorship of Mahammad ibn Aydahis was challenged by his cousins, the nine sons of his direct predecessor, Aydahis, Alimirah, Kadhafo, Hanfadhe, Alo and Yayyo (the later sultan)		
Yayyo ibn Mahammad ibn Hanfere: Afar: Yayyo Mahammad		c. 1902	1927			
Mahammad Yayyo: Afar: Mahammad Yayyo		1927	1944			
Alimirah Hanfere: Afar: Qali Mirac Canfaxe		1944	2011	In 1945 Awsa is incorporated into Ethiopia. Sultan in exile from 1975 to 1991		
Hanfere Alimirah: Canfaxe Qali Mirac		2011	2020	succeeded his father		
Ahmed Alimirah Hanfare		2023	currently in place			

== See also ==
- Sultanate of the Geledi
- Sultanate of Ifat
- Isaaq Sultanate
- Walashma dynasty
