= Sultanate of Aussa =

1734–1936 kingdom existed in Ethiopia and Eritrea

- 1734–1936
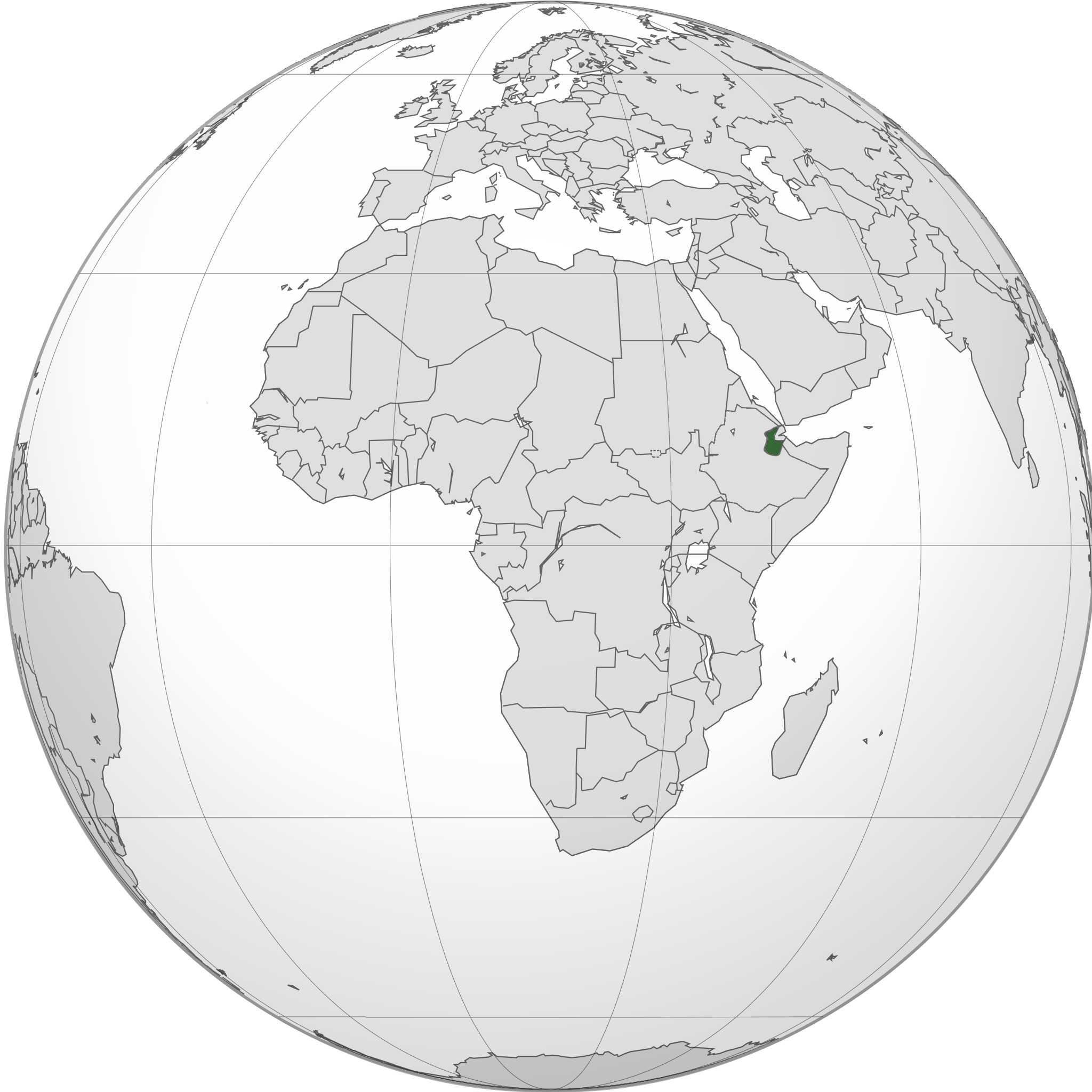
- Aussa on modern map of Africa
- Capital: Aussa
- Common languages: Afar; Arabic; Somali
- Religion: Sunni Islam
- Government: Monarchy
- Sultan
  - 1734–1749: Kedafu
  - 1927–1936: Mahammad Yayyo
- Historical era: Early modern period to Interwar period
  - Established: 1734
  - Disestablished: 1936

Area
  - Total: 76,868 km^{2} (29,679 sq mi)
Preceded by	Succeeded by
Imamate of Aussa; Dankali Sultanate	Italian East Africa
- Today part of: Ethiopia; Eritrea; Djibouti

The Sultanate of Aussa was a kingdom that existed in the Afar Triangle in southern Eritrea, eastern Ethiopia and western Djibouti from the 18th to the 20th century. It was considered to be the leading monarchy of the Afar people, to whom the other Afar rulers nominally acknowledged primacy.

During the 19th century, the Danakil country managed to remain independent from the Khedivate of Egypt and the Ethiopian Empire. On 1 April 1936, the Sultanate was invaded and occupied by the Italians during the Second Italo-Ethiopian War. The sultanate was then disestablished and incorporated into Italian East Africa as a part of the Eritrea and the Harar Governorates.

== History ==
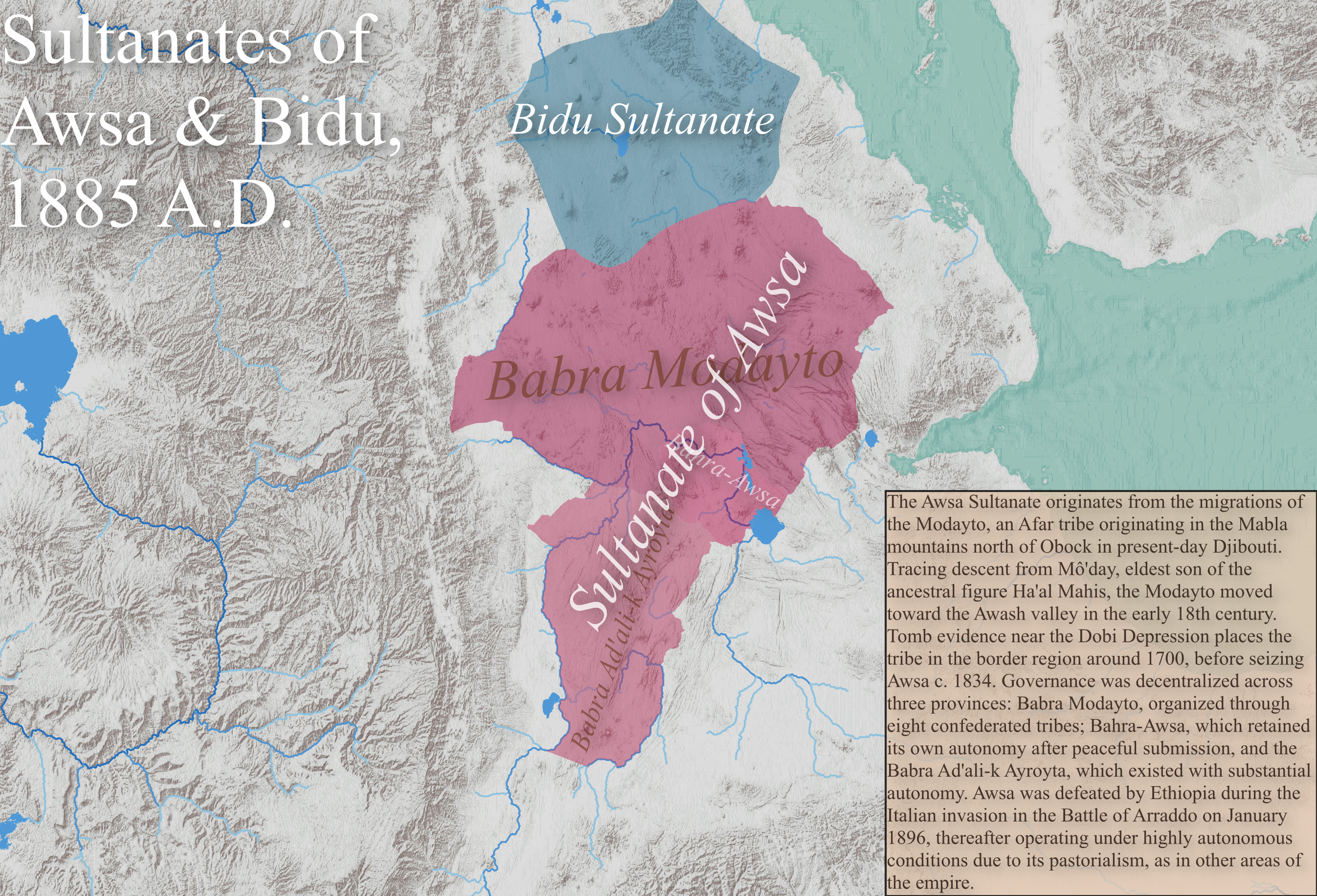
Map of the sultanates of Awsa & Bidu, 1885 A.D.

=== Imamate of Aussa ===
Afar society has traditionally been divided into petty kingdoms, each ruled by its own Sultan.

The Imamate of Aussa was carved out of the Adal Sultanate in 1577, when Muhammed Gasa moved his capital from Harar to Aussa (Asaita) with the split of the Adal Sultanate into Aussa.

In 1647, the rulers of the Emirate of Harar broke away to form their own polity. The Imamate of Aussa was later destroyed by the local Mudaito Afar in 1672. Following the Awsa Imamate's demise, the Mudaito Afars founded their own kingdom, the Sultanate of Aussa. At some point after 1672, Aussa declined in conjunction with Imam Umar Din bin Adam's recorded ascension to the throne.

=== Sultanate ===
In 1734, the Afar leader Data Kadafo, head of the Mudaito clan, seized power and established the Mudaito dynasty after overthrowing the Harla led Adal Sultanate which had occupied the region since the thirteenth century. This marked the start of a new and more sophisticated polity that would last into the colonial period. The primary symbol of the Sultan was a silver baton, which was considered to have magical properties. The influence of the sultanate extended into the Danakil lowlands of what is now Eritrea.

After 15 years of rule, Kadafo's son, Muhammäd Kadafo, succeeded him as Sultan. Muhammäd Kadafo three decades later bequeathed the throne to his own son, Aydahis, who in turn would reign for another twenty-two years. According to Richard Pankhurst, these relatively long periods of rule by modern standards pointed to a certain degree of political stability within the state.

Aussa's prosperity was coveted by Afars from neighbouring lands and in particular the Debne-Wemas, the strongest of the southern Adoimara. In the last decade of the 18th century they wished to capture the capital therefore they enlisted in the support of a number of Yemen matchlockmen from Aden. According to Krapf and Isenberg, were no less than a few hundred strong and enjoyed a complete monopoly of firepower.

William Cornwallis Harris had stated that the town's defence was organised by the ruler Yusuf ibn Idjahis, a brave and martial sultan, whose armoury boasted several cannons and matchlocks. He claimed that the defenders caught the would-be attackers off guard, while they were sleeping and cut all the throats of "all save one". The Debne-Wemas, according to this account were not intimidated by this reverse returned with fresh allies from the coast that they rallied and had achieved a murderous defeat of the Mudaitos. Yusuf was slain after which the town was sacked and the garrison was put to the sword.

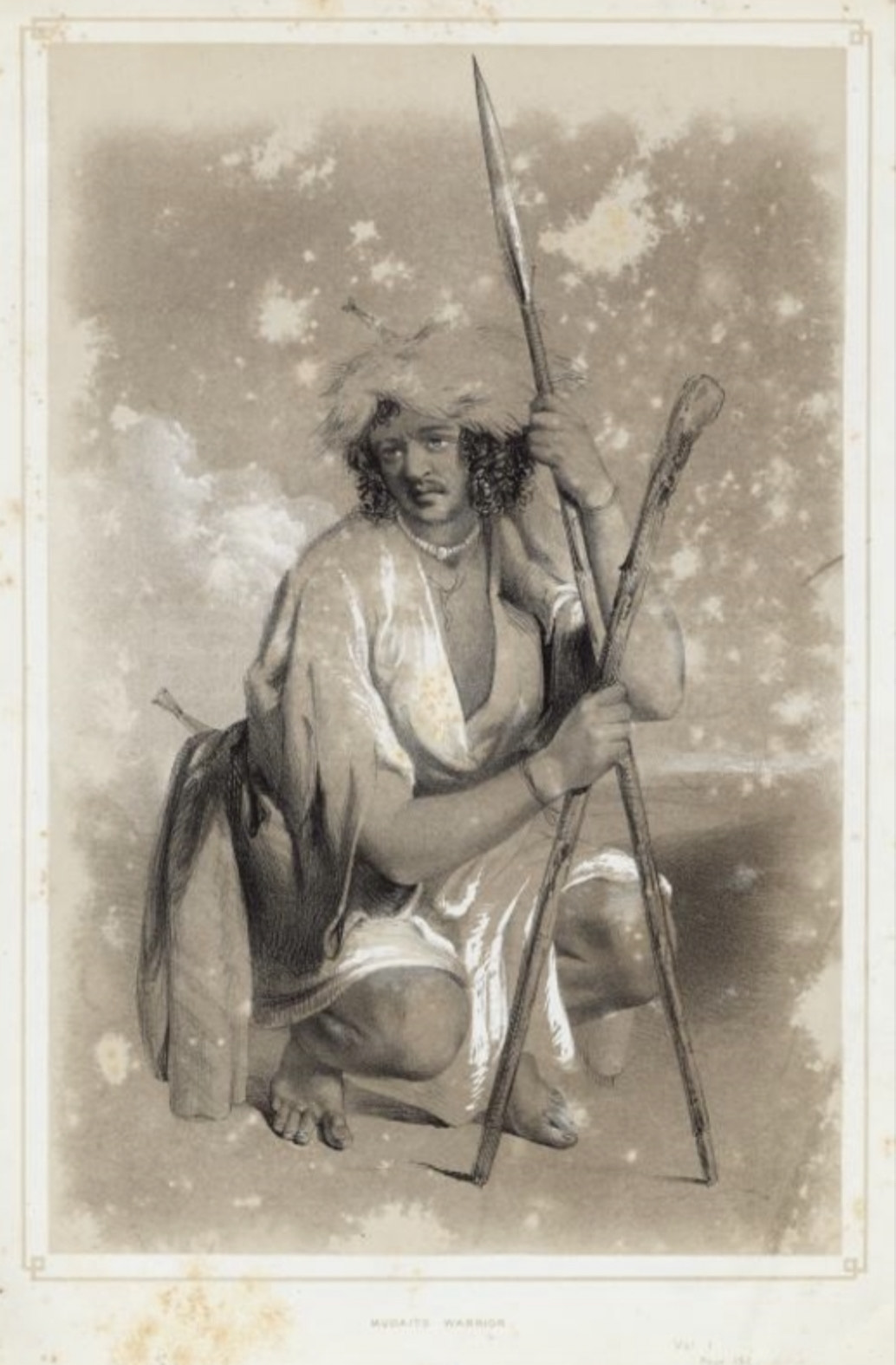
Mudaïto warrior illustrated by Sir William Cornwallis Harris

The instability from this invasion had caused the Aussa state to suffer greatly. Aussa, once an important place had lost much of its political significance but had remained an extensive encampment frequented by innumerable Afars and Somalis as a place for perpetual fairs.

From the end of the 18th century, the Mudaito pressed against the Haralla and the remaining Imamate structure from the eastern edge of Awsa. Sultan Hanfadhe Aydahis (r. 1832–1862) brought this campaign to a close with a decisive victory at the Battle of Darma in 1834, consolidating Mudaito control over the sultanate.

Sultan Mahammad ibn Hanfadhe defeated and killed Werner Munzinger in 1875, who was leading an Egyptian army into Ethiopia.

=== Colonial period ===
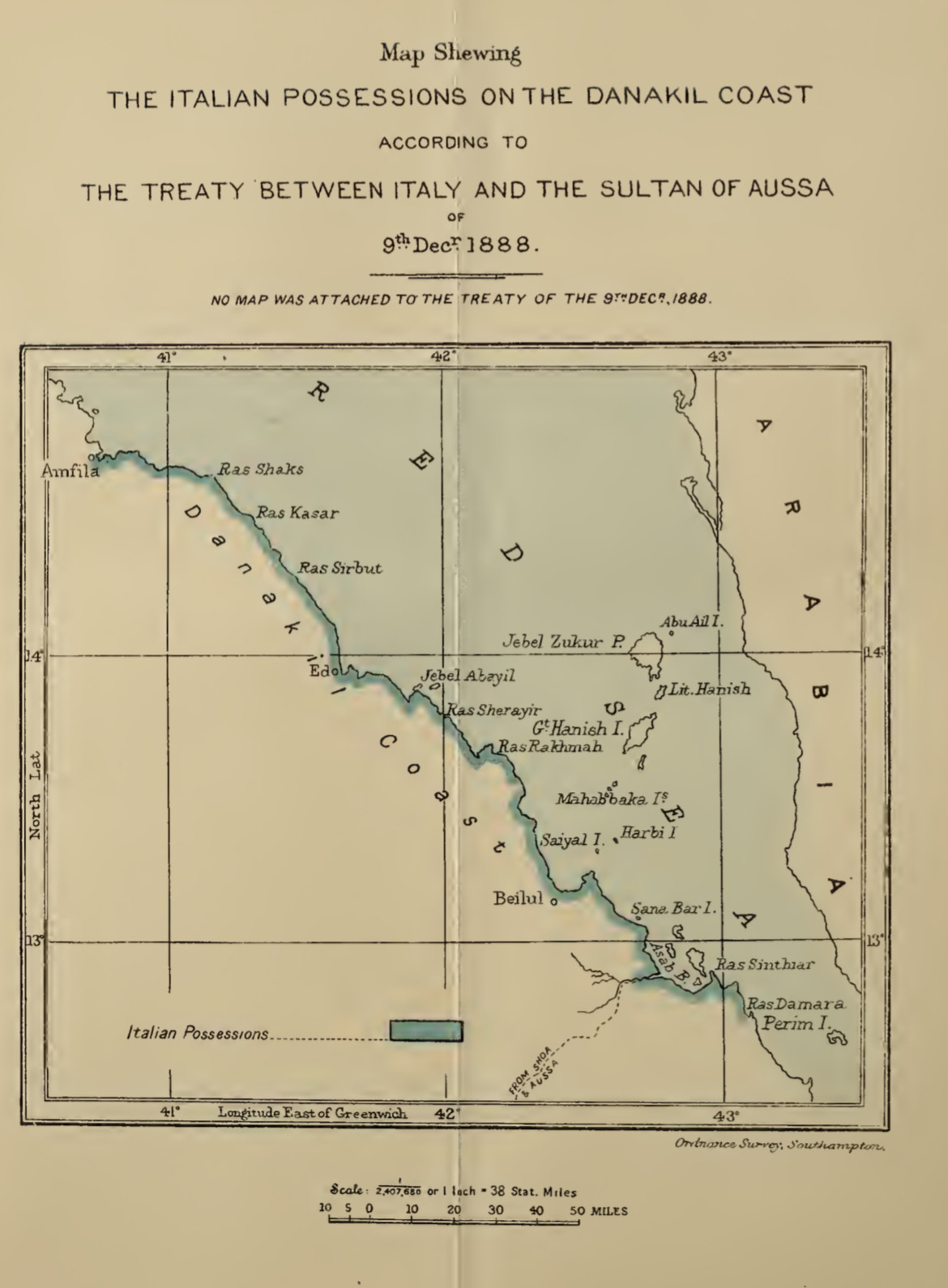
The Italian possessions of the Danakil Coast according to the treaty between Italy and the Sultan of Aussa

In 1869, the newly unified Italy bought Assab from a local Sultan (which became the colony of Eritrea in 1890), and led Sultan Mahammad to sign several treaties with that country. On 6 December 1889, Aussa signed a treaty with the Italians, agreeing to become a protectorate of Italy. Article 5 of the treaty concluded between the Italians and the Sultan Mahammad Hanfare stated that in a case of any other power trying to occupy Aussa or any parts of his territory, the Sultan must oppose it and declare that his nation is an Italian protectorate and must raise the Italian flag. According to Article 3, the Sultan had recognised the whole Danakil coast from Amphila Bay to Ras Doumeira as an Italian possession and had conceded the territories of Gambo Kona and Ablis as a part of Italian Eritrea.

During the First Italo–Ethiopian War, the Ethiopian Emperor Menelik II stationed an army near Aussa to "make sure the Sultan of Awsa would not honor his promise of full cooperation with Italy". Welde Giyorgis Aboye then invaded the sultanate and defeated Sultan Muhammad Hanfare at the battle of Arraddó in January 1896. After this, Aussa became a tributary of the Ethiopian Empire, Hanfare secured a modicum of autonomy within the Ethiopian Empire by accepting Menelik's indirect rule.

Between 1912 and 1917, after many years of internal conflict, Mahammad Yayyo came to power in the semi independent sultanate, putting an end to years of bloodshed.

=== Second Italo-Abyssinian War ===
The meeting between Mussolini and the Sultan of Aussa

During the Second Italo-Ethiopian War, Sultan Mahammad Yayyo Ussa, after initially being put to flight by an Italian expedition made up of 350 Yemeni mercenaries under Vittorio Ruggero and Francesco De Martini, cooperated with the Italian invaders, who on 1 April 1936, completely occupied the sultanate. Upon a visit to Rome, Sultan Mahammad Yayyo met Benito Mussolini and declared a speech of his loyalty towards the Italian Empire in Palazzo Venezia.

Duce, dal tempo più lontano, la mia famiglia è stata nemica degli abissini, nemici della potente Italia. Mio nonno e mio padre sono sempre stati amici dell'Italia ed io, con il cuore e con la spada, sono un soldato dell'Impero italiano. Per la mia fedeltà ho chiesto il premio di vedervi. Oggi Vi vedo ed ho la gioia di ripetere a Voi il mio giuramento di fedeltà della gente della mia razza. Riporterò al mio Paese la Vostra immagine e la Vostra parola. Dio benedica la Vostra opera e ci mantenga sulla giusta via della Vostra Volontà. Io Vi offro questo tappeto che fu già del Negus Micael e che poi Ligg Jasu donò a mio padre: sono lieto che questo tappeto, fatto per i sovrani abissini, sia oggi proprietà del Fondatore dell'Impero

— Sultan Yayyo's speech to Benito Mussolini
Translation:

Duce, from the earliest times, my family has been an enemy of the Abyssinians, enemies of mighty Italy. My grandfather and my father have always been friends of Italy, and I with heart and sword, am a soldier of the Italian Empire. For my fidelity I have asked for the reward of seeing you Today I see you and I have the joy of repeating the oath to you of my allegiance of the people of my race. I will repeat your image and your word to my country. God bless your work and keep us on track way of your will. I offer you this carpet which was already by the Negus Mikael and which later, Lij Iyasu gifted to my father: I am delighted that this rug, made for the Abyssinian sovereigns, is today property of the Founder of the Empire.

=== Revival within modern Ethiopia ===
After the defeat of the Italians, in 1943 the reinstalled Ethiopian government sent a military expedition that captured Sultan Mahammad Yayyo and replaced him with one of his relatives, Alimirah Hanfare. Sultan Alimirah often came into conflict with the central government over its encroachment on the authority of the Sultanate. Aussa, which had been more-or-less self-governing until the Sultan's ascension in 1944, had been greatly weakened in power by the centralising forces of Haile Selassie's government. In 1950 he withdrew from Asaita for two years in opposition, returning only two after following mediation by Fitawrari Yayyo. The Sultan sought to unite the Afar people under an autonomous Sultanate, while remaining part of Ethiopia; they had been divided amongst the provinces of Hararghe, Shewa, Tigray, and Wollo.

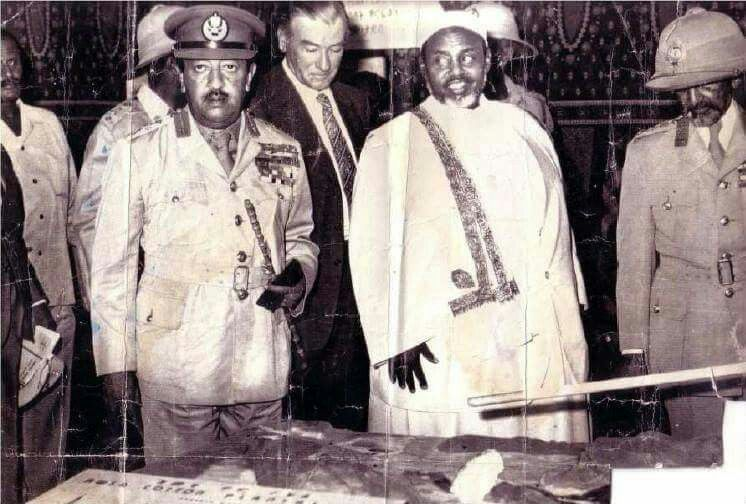
Sultan Alimirah Hanfare of Afar with Emperor Haile Selassie on the right and the Emperor's son Crown Prince Asfaw Wossen on the left

In 1961, when it was clear the Eritrean federal arrangement was headed towards its demise, 55 Afar chieftains in Eritrea met and endorsed the idea of an Ethiopian Afar autonomy. Following the dissolution of Eritrea's federal government and its transformation into a centrally-administered province, Afar leaders met again in Assab in 1963 and supported the creation of an autonomous region. In 1964, Afar leaders went to Addis Ababa to present Haile Selassie with their proposal, but the effort came up empty-handed. Despite these encroachments and conflicts, the Sultan remained fundamentally loyal to the Emperor and Ethiopia; in turn, while he did not achieve the autonomous sultanate he desired, he enjoyed an appreciable level of autonomy in the areas of the Sultanate, almost unique amongst the many petty kingdoms incorporated into the Ethiopian state in the late 19th century. For example, while the government appointed a governor to the awrajja (district) of Aussa proper, the governor, rather than taking up residence in the capital of Asaita, instead sat in Bati, which was outside the district entirely.

In 1975, Sultan Alimirah Hanfare was exiled to Saudi Arabia, but returned after the fall of the Derg regime in 1991. Upon Alimirah Hanfere's death in 2011, his son Hanfere Alimirah was named his successor as sultan.

== Religion ==
The state religion of the kingdom was Sunni Islam. The religious elites of Aussa commonly carried the honorific title Kabir.

== List of sultans ==
- Kandhafo 1734–1749
- Kadhafo Mahammad ibn Kadhafo 1749–1779
- Aydahis ibn Kadhafo Mahammad 1779–1801
- Aydahis ibn Mahammad ibn Aydahis 1801–1832
- Hanfadhe ibn Aydahis 1832–1862
- Mahammad "Illalta" ibn Hanfadhe 1862–1902
- Mahammad ibn Aydahis ibn Hanfadhe 1902–1910
- Yayyo ibn Mahammad ibn Hanfadhe 1902–1927
- Mahammad Yayyo 1927–1944
- Alimirah Hanfare 1944–1975, 1991–2011
- Hanfare Alimirah 2011–2020
- Ahmed Alimirah 2020–present

== See also ==
- Afar Region
- List of Sunni Muslim dynasties
- Malak
