= Alimirah Hanfare =

Alimirah Hanfere

Sultan of Aussa
- Reign: 1944 – 24 April 2011
- Coronation: 1945
- Predecessor: Mahammad Yayyo
- Successor: Hanfare Alimirah
- Born: c. 1919; Fursi, Ethiopia
- Died: 25 April 2011 (aged 91–92); Addis Ababa, Ethiopia
- Burial: 28 April 2011; Asaita, Ethiopia
- Issue: Hanfare Alimirah
- Dynasty: Mudaito Dynasty
- Religion: Sunni Islam

Bitwoded Sultan Alimirah Hanfare (Afar: Amyota Qali Mirac Canfaxe; c. 1919 – 25 April 2011) was Sultan of Aussa from 1944 until his death in 2011. He ascended to the throne after his predecessor and uncle, Mahammad Yayyo.

Loyal to his suzerain, Emperor Haile Selassie I, Alimirah possessed only moderate governing authority as Sultan, but was highly influential as a landowner and as the senior spiritual and cultural leader of the Afar people. Under his rule, significant progress was made towards modernising agriculture amongst the pastoral Afar; attracting foreign investment, organising access to credit, and promoting infrastructural development.

After the overthrow of the Ethiopian monarchy by the Derg, Sultan Alimirah was targeted by the new socialist regime for his influence, status as a landowner, and support for the deposed emperor. In 1975 the Sultan was forced to flee the country when the Derg attempted to capture him in a bloody raid on Asaita, and proceeded to establish the Afar Liberation Front to resist the government and defend the Afar's rights to their land.

Upon the Derg's overthrow in 1991 the Sultan returned to Ethiopia, where he initially supported the efforts of the Ethiopian People's Revolutionary Democratic Front led by Meles Zenawi. Relations quickly soured, however, over the issue of Afars in Eritrea, whom the Sultan wanted to remain part of an autonomous Afar region within Ethiopia. This, amongst other disputes, led to the Sultan's marginalisation from the politics of the new Afar Region.

Sultan Alimirah died on 24 April 2011 and was succeeded by his son Hanfare Alimirah. Alimirah was not only considered a leader of the Afar people, but was admired by many Ethiopians for his patriotism, resistance to the Derg, and support for Ethiopian unity.

== Early life ==
Alimirah Hanfere was born in the village of Fursi, which is today divided between the Amhara Region and the Afar Region. He was said to have been born around 1919, but at his death was said to be 95 years old, suggesting he was born earlier. A member of the Aussa Mudaito Dynasty, and the youngest of three children, with two older sisters, Fatima and Medina, his father was Hanfare Aydahis and mother was Hawy Omar. His grandfather, Mahammad ibn Hanfere, was himself Sultan of Aussa from 1862 to 1902, who declared his loyalty to Emperor Menelik II and defeated an Egyptian force led by Werner Munzinger attempting to invade Ethiopia in 1875.

His father was killed while his mother was pregnant with Alimirah, and she herself died when Alimirah was young, leaving him to be raised by his eldest sister, Fatima. Fatima married Fitawrari Yayyo Hamadu, an important leader of the Aussa, second only to the Sultan, Mahammad Yayyo. Yayyo Hamadu was entrusted with the transport of goods between the port of Assab and the capital Addis Ababa by camel caravans, making him wealthy and also facilitating a close friendship with Ras Tafari Makonnen, the future Haile Selassie I.

When Italy invaded Ethiopia in 1935, Sultan Muhammad agreed to not resist the Italians in exchange for being allowed their autonomy. When the Aussas made a visit to Rome in 1939, Yayyo and Alimirah, his son-in-law, visited the imprisoned Leul Ras Imru Haile Selassie, whom they helped financially and pleaded (unsuccessfully) to be released. Upon Ethiopia's liberation in 1941, Yayyo and Alimirah captured nearly a thousand Italian soldiers and brought them to Addis Ababa to commemorate the Emperor's return.

=== Rise to power ===
While the actions of Yayyo and Alimirah strengthened their friendship with Haile Selassie, it was against the wishes of Sultan Mohammed, who sought to follow by the terms of his agreement with the Italians and leave their troops alone. Furthermore, Sultan Mohammed sought to place the Aussa Sultanate under British administration in the manner of Eritrea and the Ogaden. This was greatly opposed by many Aussa and Yayyo, who said "Our emperor is back, the white people were defeated," causing a major rift between the two; Sultan Mohammed dismissed Yayyo in 1942.

One day sometime in 1944, Yayyo was called to join the Sultan after prayers. Concluding this was a ruse to have him killed, Yayyo instead fled to Addis Ababa after expressing his thoughts to Emperor Haile Selassie. While both agreeing that the Sultan should be removed, Yayyo felt that he would not be accepted by the Afars as Sultan, as he did not come from the senior Aydahisso branch of the Mudaito dynasty. Instead, he proposed that Alimirah, who did come from the Aydahisso clan, become Sultan. Six months after this incident, the plot was set into action. Alimirah was made a Dejazmach, and Yayyo restored to his title of Fitawrari, and several thousand soldiers of the Kebur Zabagna (Imperial Guard) were placed under their control.

The force led by Yayyo and Alimirah set out to Asaita to oust the Sultan, taking a fortnight to travel. To keep their advance a secret, they detained any Afar person they saw travelling on the way, placing them in one of several empty trucks provided for that purpose, and arranged for the prohibition of any travel past the town of Bati, a key trading post to the Afar regions. Upon eventually being warned of the force's advance when they were only a day away, Sultan Mohammed dismissed them and even chastised his son for attempting to rally the palace guard in defense, convinced that such an attempt was impossible.

Thus, when the force arrived in Asaita the following day, it faced virtually no resistance, with only one guard on duty. Sultan Mohammed was deposed, and, after being assured his family members would not be killed (as was typical in Afar power struggles), was sent to Addis Ababa, where he died of natural causes some time later.

== Reign as Sultan ==
Assuming the throne at only 22 years old, Sultan Alimirah was heavily influenced by Fitawrari Yayyo, but over time was able to a centralise power in himself, often to the detriment of the lesser chiefs that traditionally exercised significant power. His authority was also compromised by the provincial authorities and imperial government who asserted their control over the lands of the Sultanate, often a matter of bitter contention between the Sultan and the central government. Despite this, the relationship between the Sultan and Haile Selassie was a loyal one.

=== Development efforts ===
Much like the imperial government and Haile Selassie on a national scale, Sultan Alimirah worked to improve the agricultural situation in Aussa, which accounted for the livelihoods of the vast majority of the Afar people. He facilitated the establishment of several large commercial farms in Aussa, primarily producing cotton, as well as other crops. Thus many formerly pastoral Afars began to settle in towns to work on the new cotton farms.

While the Sultan owned many of these new large commercial farms, he arranged for the Addis Ababa Bank (later nationalised and today part of the Commercial Bank of Ethiopia) to open a branch in Asaita to stimulate the expansion of the agricultural sector, and founded the Aussa Farmers Association to make it easier for Afar farmers to take out loans co-operatively. In the 1960s, a joint venture between the British firm Mitchell Cotts and the Ethiopian government was created to produce cotton in the region, under the Sultan's supervision. In contrast to the government's state farms, the scheme worked to cooperate with the local people and create large farms whilst respecting traditional customs of collective ownership. By the time of the Sultan's flight in 1975, it was noted that there were 600 tractors, 80 bulldozers, and 30 Cessna planes in the Aussa awrajja, a large amount relative to the rest of the country.

The Sultan also opened several health clinics schools in Aussa, including a boarding school and madrassah for all Afars in Asaita. He opposed the consumption of khat, organised Islamic leaders, reformed religious practices, and proclaimed rights for women. Indeed, some came to refer to Aussa as "Kuwait" due to its relative wealth.

In 1972 the Sultan visited the United States at the invitation of USAID, where he visited 15 states and met with African-American leaders such as Jesse Jackson and Elijah Muhammad. He was impressed by the warm reception accorded, especially after giving a speech in Chicago praising the leadership of Haile Selassie and receiving a standing ovation. Following this trip, it was arranged for several Afar students to study in the United States.

=== Disputes and efforts for autonomy ===
Sultan Alimirah often came into conflict with the central government over its encroachment on the authority of the Sultanate. Aussa, which had been more-or-less self-governing until the Sultan's ascension in 1944, had been greatly weakened in power by the centralising forces of Haile Selassie's government. In 1950 he withdrew from Asaita for two years in opposition, returning only two after following mediation by Fitawrari Yayyo.

The Sultan sought to unite the Afar people under an autonomous Sultanate, while remaining part of Ethiopia; they had been divided amongst the provinces of Hararghe, Shewa, Tigray, and Wollo. In 1961, when it was clear the Eritrean federal arrangement was headed towards its demise, 55 Afar chieftains in Eritrea met and endorsed the idea of an Ethiopian Afar autonomy. Following the dissolution of Eritrea's federal government and its transformation into a centrally-administered province, Afar leaders met again in Assab in 1963 and supported the creation of an autonomous region. In 1964 Afar leaders went to Addis Ababa to present Haile Selassie with their proposal, but the effort came up empty-handed.

In the early 1970s the Ethiopian government established a "Awash Valley Authority" to advance the development of the Awash River basin through introducing large-scale commercial farms. While intended to the help the region's development, the scheme would have displaced thousands of rural Afars from their ancestral land and separated them from the river on which they depended for their livelihood and very survival. After strenuous objections from Sultan Alimirah on their behalf, the scheme was abandoned- although it is thought protecting his own large plantations also played a role.

Despite these encroachments and conflicts, the Sultan remained fundamentally loyal to the Emperor and Ethiopia; in turn, while he did not achieve the autonomous sultanate he desired, he enjoyed an appreciable level of autonomy in the areas of the Sultanate, almost unique amongst the many petty kingdoms incorporated into the Ethiopian state in the late 19th century. For example, while the government appointed a governor to the awrajja (district) of Aussa proper, the governor, rather than taking up residence in the capital of Asaita, instead sat in Bati, which was outside the district entirely.

The Sultan enjoyed a warm relationship with Haile Selassie, and was eventually granted the title of Bitwoded, the second highest title attainable by a non-member of the royal family. Assessing his relationship with the emperor, Alimirah recalled that "[Haile Selassie] looked at us peripheral rulers with respect. We had good relations with him. He never interfered directly in our internal affairs. I had direct access to his palace or his office."

== Death and burial ==
Sultan Alimirah died on April 24, 2011, in Addis Ababa, at approximately the age of 95. He was buried in the northeastern town of Asaita, the former capital of the Afar Region.

== Legacy and assessment ==
Amongst Afars, Alimirah is revered as a "beloved spiritual father, leader, and caretaker" who was dedicated to the progress and unity of his people. In his efforts to advance the Afar economy, he is thought to have balanced the benefits of agricultural modernisation with respect for tradition and traditional land ownership. As a leader, he is thought to have been just and morally upright, leading one commentator to say that "Under the rule of Sultan Alimirah no one walks away without justice. The legacy he built was support to the needy, justice to the poor, and share the resources of the community for [the] common well-being of the people."

While not granted much power in the new government, the actions of the Afar Liberation Front during the transition period and the early years of the Federal Democratic Republic of Ethiopia demonstrated the Sultan's sincerity; it worked to establish democratic institutions, health and educational facilities and other economic and social institutions amongst the Afar.

Most Afars his consistency in promoting the unity of the Afar people. First through his efforts to advance Afar unity and protect Afar interests during the reign of Haile Selassie, followed by armed resistance against the dictatorship of Mengistu Haile Mariam in defense of the Afar and their land and custom, and in turn followed by his attempts to preserve Afar unity across Ethiopia and Eritrea made him a near-legendary figure. Therefore, he was regarded as the spiritual and cultural leader of all Afars at the time of his death, and not just those traditionally under the rule of the Aussa Sultanate.

The Sultan is also widely admired by non-Afar Ethiopians, particularly those amongst the opposition expressing an Ethiopian nationalist viewpoint, for his patriotism, loyalty, and dedication to Ethiopia's unity. Despite seeking to unite the Afar people under his leadership, and despite the slights committed by the imperial state and the atrocities of the communist dictatorship against the Afar, he did not seek independence and instead committed the Aussa Sultanate and the Afar people to Ethiopia, stridently condemning those who sought an independent Afar state, saying, "We are one with all Ethiopians. No one can make excuses and take this identity from the Afar people. Only the forces who are anti-Afar people will make claims of separation. We will not hesitate to expose them for what they are. This must be done for the unity of our Ethiopian people."

He was also deeply loyal to Emperor Haile Selassie, even going as far to once say that "Haile Selassie is not the leader for Ethiopia only, but he is the leader for all black people in the world, wherever they might be." When touring the United States in 1972, he delivered several speeches praising the emperor's leadership, and inquired after the well-being of the Ethiopians living in the cities he visited. He was recognised for his resistance to the Fascist occupiers and his attempts to look after the well-being of other Ethiopians such as Le'ul Ras Imru Haile Selassie who had been imprisoned by them. He gave generously to charitable institutions throughout Ethiopia; for example he gave 10,000 birr, at that time a large sum (adjusted for inflation, around 640,000 birr in today's prices), to a local Addis Ababa edir (traditional co-operative funerary association) operating in the neighbourhood of his house in the city. When Prime Minister Meles Zenawi remarked that the flag of Ethiopia was "just a common rag", the Sultan was said to have retorted that "even our camels salute the Ethiopian flag". For these reasons, Alimirah Hanfare is considered to be a heroic patriot by many Ethiopians.

Furthermore, the Sultan is particularly admired by nationalist opponents of the Ethiopian People's Revolutionary Democratic Front for his opposition to Eritrean independence and for his desire to incorporate Afar regions of Eritrea into Ethiopia as part of the Afar Region. When representatives of the opposition movements that had worked to overthrow the government of Mengistu Haile Mariam met in July 1991, the Sultan discovered that the delegates of the Eritrean People's Liberation Front had elected not to participate as representatives but merely observers. Upon learning this was because they sought to separate from Ethiopia, the Sultan attacked them, saying that "in my opinion this conference was not to dismember Ethiopia but to unite Ethiopia. A conference that discusses how to achieve equality, justice, democracy and good governance for all Ethiopians. The Ethiopian people expect us to come out of this conference with a new government and democracy, not two different nations." His desire to unite Afars as part of Ethiopia also garnered the respect of nationalists, particularly because such an effort, if successful, would have preserved Ethiopian control over a significant stretch of sea-coast, and port of Assab, therefore preventing the country from becoming the most populous landlocked country in the world, an outcome the Sultan also explicitly opposed. To these people, Sultan Alimirah is to be considered more patriotic and dedicated to Ethiopian unity than the Ethiopian government itself.

However, the Sultan was not without his critics. He was considered to be an illegitimate usurper, placed into power by Ethiopian intervention and intrigue. He was attacked by the Derg and leftist Afars as a feudalist landowner who was willing to sell out the Afar people for his own self interests. The Ethiopian People's Revolutionary Democratic Front levelled similar criticisms, opposing its conservative ideology, the ALF's apparently lavish expenditure of the regional budget, the Sultan's undisguised favor towards the Aussa area for economic development, and the intrigues of the various members of the Alimirah family with regional players.
