= Khalil (scholar) =

19th century Sufi scholar and leading religious figure in Harar

Khalil خليل
- Title: Kabir, Sheikh

Personal life
- Died: Harar, Emirate of Harar
- Resting place: Harar
- Era: Modern Islamic period
- Region: Emirate of Harar
- Main interest(s): Sufism, Fiqh

Religious life
- Religion: Islam
- Denomination: Sunni
- Jurisprudence: Shafi'i
- Tariqa: Qadiriyya order
- Creed: Ash'ari

Muslim leader
- Influenced by: Abdul Qadir Gilani, Abadir Umar ar-Rida
- Influenced: Sheikh Madar, Abdullah al-Harari

Kabir Khalil or scholar Khalil was a 19th-century scholar and one of the three head Ulama in the Emirate of Harar. He was a member of the Qadiriyya order which was prominent in the Horn of Africa at the time.

== Biography ==
Kabir Khalil was a Harari scholar and was fluent in both Harari, and Arabic. During the reign of Emir Ahmad Ibn Abu Bakr the European explorer Richard Burton would visit Harar in 1855 and described Khalil as the leading religious figure in the city. The other Harari scholar being Kabir Yonis, and Shaykh Jami of the Berteri Somali descent were also highly regarded.

Khalil advised his pupil Sheikh Madar to establish a Qadiriyya tariqa commune in present-day Hargeisa and spread the tariqa and its values. One of which being to try and reduce the tribal conflict along the trade route between Harar and Berbera, which was damaging livelihoods and causing unnecessary death. This led Sheikh Madar and his companions to found the Big Commune (Jama’a weyne) of Little Harar (Hargeisa) in circa 1860. Sheikh Madar also started sorghum plantations in the vicinity of the town to maintain self-sufficiency, as well as taking care of the sick and elderly inhabitants of the growing settlement. This cultivation soon spread and was taken up eagerly across the region by Somalis.

== See also ==
- Sheikh Madar the most famous pupil of Kabir Khalil
- Hargeisa the town Khalil's student Sheikh Madar would transform drastically
- Sheikh Uways Al-Barawi leading Qadiriyya scholar from Barawa architect of the Benadir revolt
- Richard Burton
- Harar
