= Romain Murenzi =

Rwandan scientist (born 1959)

- Born: February 1959 (age 67); Save, Rwanda
- Scientific career
- Fields: physics
- Workplaces: The World Academy of Sciences, American Association for the Advancement of Science, African Academy of Sciences, Global Research Council, Sustainable Development Solution Network

Romain Murenzi (born February 1959) is a Rwandan-American physicist and former Rwandan science minister. He graduated with a bachelor's degree from the University of Burundi in 1982. In 1986 he received his master's degree in physics from Catholic University of Louvain in Belgium and in 1990 earned his doctorate degree there. Murenzi was the executive director of TWAS, The World Academy of Sciences for the advancement of science in developing countries in Trieste, Italy. He first served in that role from April 2011 to May 2016. Then, after spending 14 months as director of the Division of Science Policy and Capacity Building in the Natural Sciences sector for UNESCO in Paris, France, he returned to his role as executive director of TWAS in September 2017 until stepping down in November 2023 to teach at Worcester Polytechnic Institute.

Murenzi was a physics professor at Clark Atlanta University (USA) from 1993 to 2001, and chairman of the physics department from 1999 to 2001. In 2001, Rwandan President Paul Kagame appointed him to serve as Minister of Education, Science, Technology and Scientific Research. From March 2006 to July 2009, he served as Minister in the President's Office in Charge of Science, Technology, and Scientific Research, with responsibilities including Information and Communications Technology. According to science and development news website SciDev.Net, as a minister Murenzi “participated in driving the country's scientific renaissance.” At international level, along other Scientists such as Andrea Zitolo and Bai Chunli, he advocates for supporting the career of young researchers in Science.

In 2009, he left Rwanda to serve as director of the American Association for the Advancement of Science (AAAS) Center for Science, Technology and Sustainable Development, which focuses especially on the developing world. He was elected a fellow of TWAS in 2005 and a fellow of the African Academy of Sciences in 2012. He also served as a visiting professor at the University of Maryland. In 2013 he earned a Master of Law degree in Information Technology and Telecommunication from the University of Strathclyde (UK).

Murenzi's scientific research has focused on applications of multidimensional continuous wavelet transforms to quantum mechanics; image and video processing; and science and technology policy. More precisely, he introduced in his PhD thesis the full two-dimensional continuous wavelet transform, including the rotation parameter. This opened the door to the notion of directional wavelets, among them the Cauchy wavelet, which are crucial in applications where directions in an image are important. In particular, this approach permits directional filtering, a technique that has been used, for instance, in fluid dynamics. After his thesis, Murenzi published a number of articles in scientific journals and contributed to many conferences, in general in collaboration with his former supervisor in Louvain, J-P. Antoine. Finally he co-authored a textbook on Two-dimensional wavelets).
