= Kwosso =

Fast-paced ball game

Ko'sso is a fast-paced ball game played by the Afar people. The ball is made up of rolled goatskins. The object of the game is to keep the ball away from players on the opposing team. In the past, Ko'sso teams could be quite large; in fact, they could be made up of over one hundred players. There is still no set number of players per team.

Wilfred Thesiger describes a very similar games played by the Afar which he calls gaso. However, his description varies from Ko'sso in that there are no teams—every player is against all others—and once the ball is taken out of the reach of the other players, the player in control of the ball then must bounce it and catch it on the back of his hand.

== See also ==
- Afar people
