= Afar people =

Cushitic ethnic group in the Horn of Africa

Afar
Qafár (Afar) العفر (Arabic)
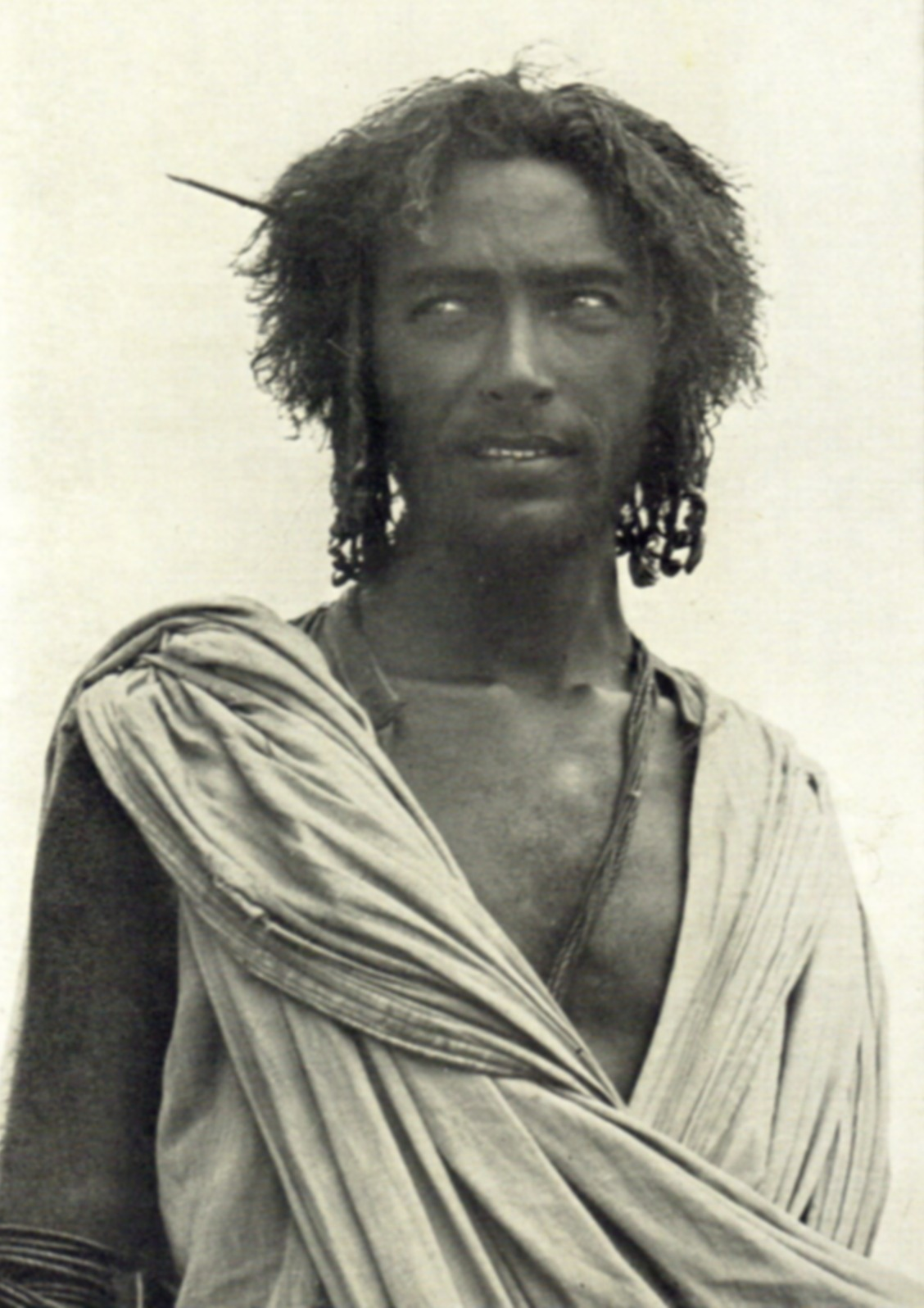
- An Afar man in nomadic attire, 1950

Total population
- 3,350,000 (2019–2022)

Regions with significant populations
- Horn of Africa
- Ethiopia: 2,700,000 (2022)
- Djibouti: 342,000 (2019)
- Eritrea: 304,000 (2022)

Languages
- Afar

Religion
- Significant Majority: Islam (99%) Significant Minority; Christianity and others (1%)

Related ethnic groups
- Saho • Somalis • Beja • Cushitic peoples

The Afar (Afar: Qafár), also known as the Danakil, Adali and Odali, are a Cushitic ethnic group inhabiting the Horn of Africa. They primarily live in the Afar Region of Ethiopia and in northern Djibouti, as well as the entire southern coast of Eritrea. The Afar speak the Afar language, which is part of the East Cushitic branch of the Afroasiatic family. Afars are the only inhabitants of the Horn of Africa whose traditional territories border both the Red Sea and the Gulf of Aden.

== Etymology ==
The etymology of the term "Dankali" can be traced back to the Afar language and is derived from the words "dan" (meaning "people" or "nation") and "kali" (referring to the Afar Region). The term has been used for centuries to refer to the Afar people, their language, culture, and way of life.

== History ==
=== Early history ===
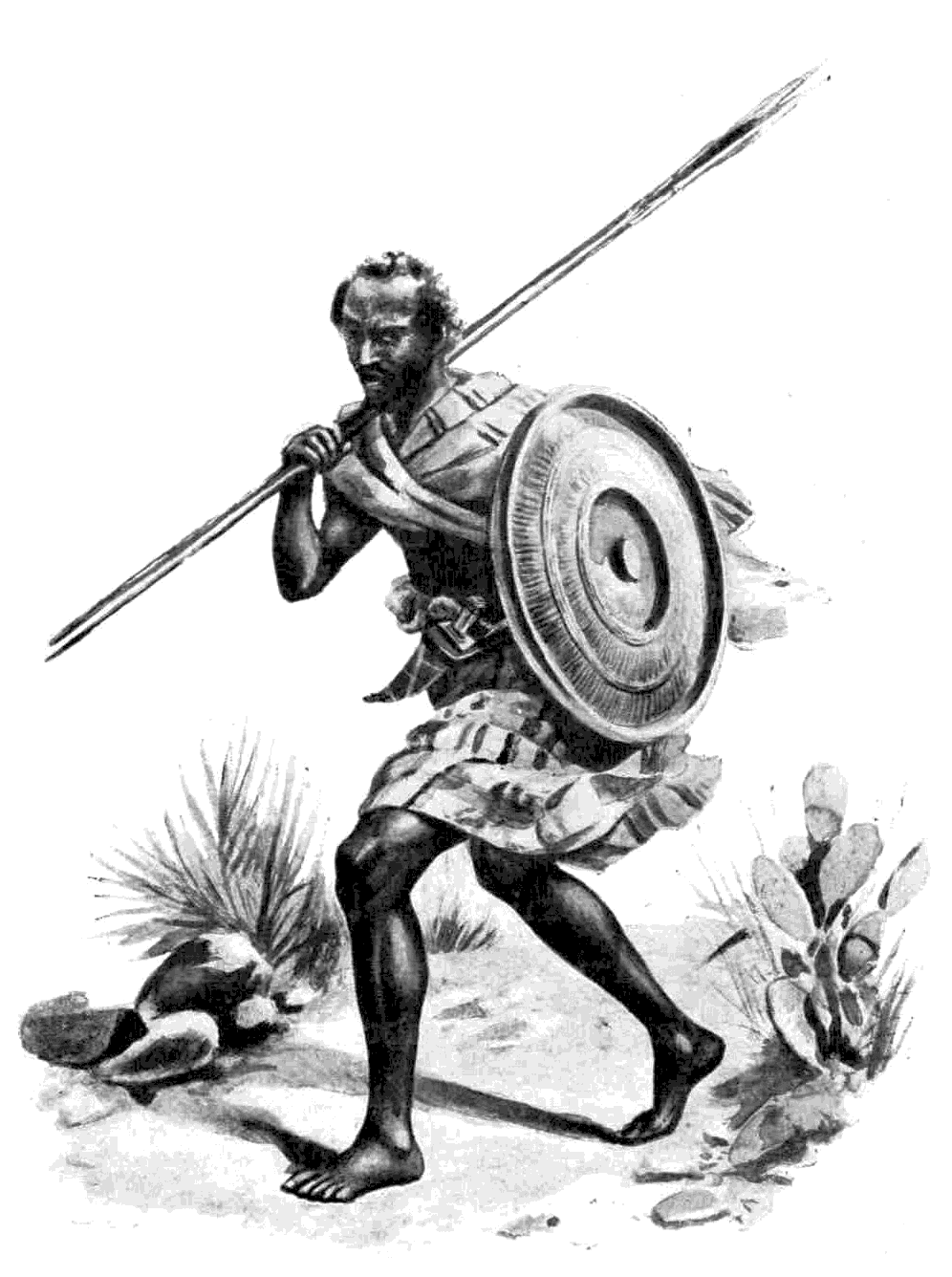
A man of the Danakil tribe

The earliest surviving written mention of the Afar is from the 13th-century Andalusian writer Ibn Sa'id, who reports of a people called Dankal, inhabiting an area which extended from the port of Suakin, to as far south as Mandeb, near Zeila.

The Afar are consistently mentioned in Ethiopian records. They are first mentioned in the royal chronicles of Emperor Amda Seyon in a campaign beyond the Awash River. The Afar country was originally known in Ethiopian records as "Adal", a word that was used to denote the area of the lower Awash River to the country north of Lake Abbe, which G.W.B Huntingford describes as a "Danakil state in heavily forested region with permanent water and swamps". The chronicler describes the Afars as being "very tall with ugly faces" and that their hair was plaited like that of women so that it "reached to their waists". The chronicler was greatly impressed by their military prowess, as he states that they were "great fighters", for when they went into battle "they tied the ends of their garments, one man to the next, that they might not flee".

They are again mentioned over a century later in the royal chronicles of Emperor Baeda Maryam. According to his chronicler the ruler of the Danakil offered to intervene and help in the Emperor's campaign against their neighbors, the Dobe'a. He sent the Emperor a horse, a mule laden with dates, a shield, and two spears to show his support, along with a message saying, "I have set up my camp, O my master, with the intention of stopping these people. If they are your enemies, I will not let them pass, and will seize them."

According to 16th century Portuguese explorer Francisco Álvares, the Kingdom of Dankali was confined by Abyssinia to its west and Adal Sultanate in the east. He also described that the Afar salt trade was extremely lucrative in the area. The mineral he adds, were considered very cheap in the Afar country, but was very valuable by the time it got to Shewa.

=== Pre-20th century ===
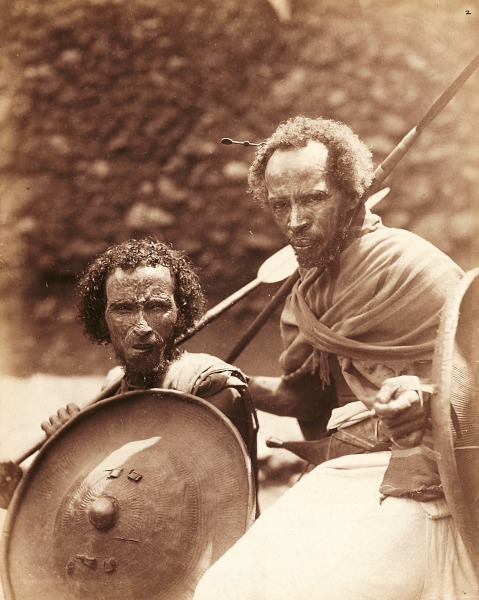
Portrait of two Afar men in traditional attire, 1888.

Afar society has traditionally been organized into independent kingdoms, each ruled by its own Sultan. Among these were the Sultanate of Aussa, Sultanate of Girrifo/Biru, Sultanate of Tadjourah, Sultanate of Rahaito, and Sultanate of Gobaad. In 1577, the Adal leader Imam Muhammed Jasa moved his capital from Harar to Aussa in modern Afar region. In 1647, the rulers of the Emirate of Harar broke away to form their own polity. Harari imams continued to have a presence in the southern Afar Region until they were overthrown in the eighteenth century by the Mudaito dynasty of Afar who later established the Sultanate of Aussa. The primary symbol of the Sultan was a silver baton, which was considered to have magical properties.

The Afar are divided into two subgroups, the Asaimara ("Red Men") and the Adoimara ("White Men"). The Asaimara were regarded as the nobility, whereas the Adoimara were seen as inferior stock. These groups are further subdivided into upwards of 150 sub-tribes, the chief tribe of the Asaimara was the Mudaito in the south, to which the sultan of Aussa belonged to. The Modaitos who occupied the region of the lower Awash, were the most powerful tribe, and no European traversed their territory without claiming the right of hospitality or the brotherhood of blood. Some Afars helped the Europeans by providing, for a fee, the security of Western caravans that circulated between the southern coast of the Red Sea and central Ethiopia. The Afars were also heavily active in the Red Sea slave trade, serving as guides to Arab slave traders. A major slave route to Arabia crossed through Afar country, with Afars reportedly still actively trading in slaves as recently as 1928.

The Afars were consistently viewed as violent and bloodthirsty, and generally had a bad reputation for massacring caravans and expeditions. As Italian explorer L. M. Nesbitt describes: "The Danakils kill any stranger on sight. The taking of a life has become a habit of their nature." In one notable incident, Werner Munzinger, along with his wife, child and a force consisting of 350 soldiers, 2 guns, and 45 camels, arrived in Tadjoura, with their errands being to open up the roads between Ankober and Tadjoura, to enter into communication with King Menelik of Shewa by traversing through the Danakil Desert. On the 14th of November upon reaching Aussa, the Egyptian force was attacked at night by a large number of Afars. The Afar massacred their army leaving only a small number left which fled to Tadjoura. Amongst the Egyptian casualties were the leader Munzinger, his wife, and his child.

Towards the end of the 19th century, the sultanates of Raheita and Tadjoura on the coasts of the Red Sea have then colonized between European powers: Italy forms Italian Eritrea with Assab and Massawa, and France the French Somaliland in Djibouti, but the inland Aussa in the south was able to maintain its independence for longer. Even comparatively fertile and located on the Awash River, it was demarcated from the outside by surrounding desert areas. Ethiopia wanted to neutralize Aussa and prevent them from helping the Italians during the course of the First Italo-Ethiopian War in 1895–1896. The show of Abyssinian force dissuaded the Afar sultan Mahammad Hanfare of the Sultanate of Aussa from honouring his treaties with Italy, and instead Hanfare secured a modicum of autonomy within the Ethiopian Empire by accepting Emperor Menelik indirect rule after the war.

=== 20th century ===
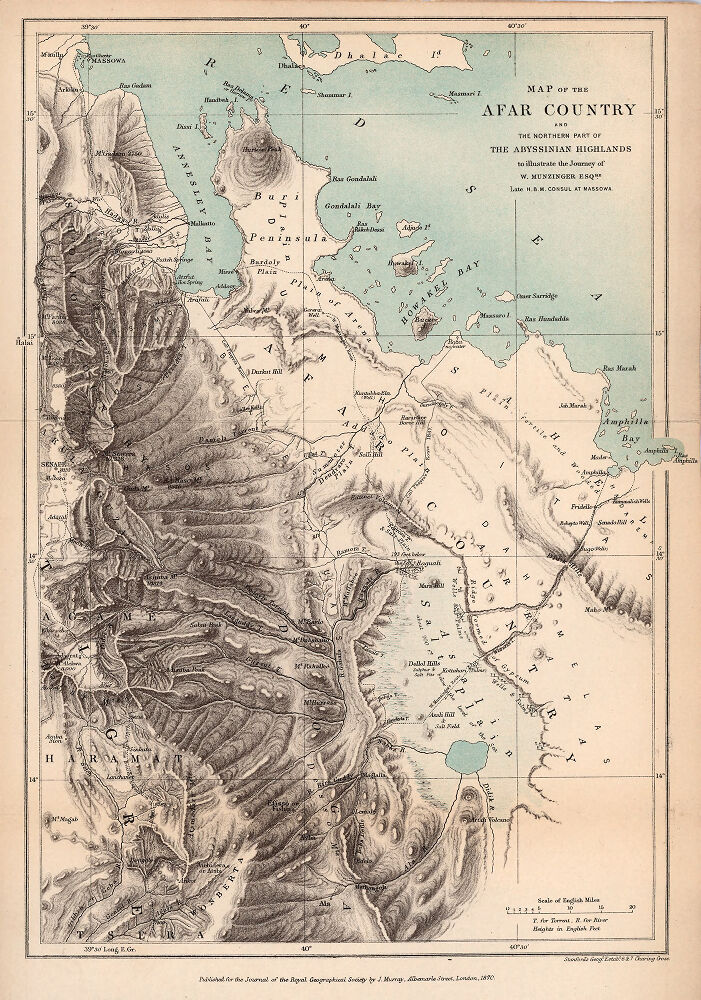
Map of the Afar Country and the Northern Part of the Abyssinian Highlands, 1869

When a modern administrative system was introduced in Ethiopia after the Second World War, the Afar areas controlled by Ethiopia were divided into the provinces of Eritrea, Tigray, Wollo, Shewa and Hararge. Tribal leaders, elders, and religious and other dignitaries of the Afar tried unsuccessfully in the government from 1961 to end this division. Following an unsuccessful rebellion led by the Afar Sultan, Alimirah Hanfare, the Afar Liberation Front was founded in 1975 to promote the interests of the Afar people. Sultan Hanfadhe was soon exiled to Saudi Arabia. Ethiopia's then-ruling communist Derg regime later established the Autonomous Region of Assab (now called Aseb and located in Eritrea), although low-level insurrection continued until the early 1990s. In Djibouti, a similar movement simmered throughout the 1980s, eventually culminating in the Afar Insurgency in 1991. After the fall of the Derg that same year, Sultan Hanfadhe returned from exile.

In March 1993, the Afar Revolutionary Democratic Front (ARDUF) was established. It constituted a coalition of three Afar organizations: the Afar Revolutionary Democratic Unity Union (ARDUU), founded in 1991 and led by Mohamooda Gaas (or Gaaz); the Afar Ummatah Demokrasiyyoh Focca (AUDF); and the Afar Revolutionary Forces (ARF). A political party, it aims to protect Afar interests. As of 2012, the ARDUF is part of the United Ethiopian Democratic Forces (UEDF) coalition opposition party.

== Demographics ==
=== Geographical distribution ===
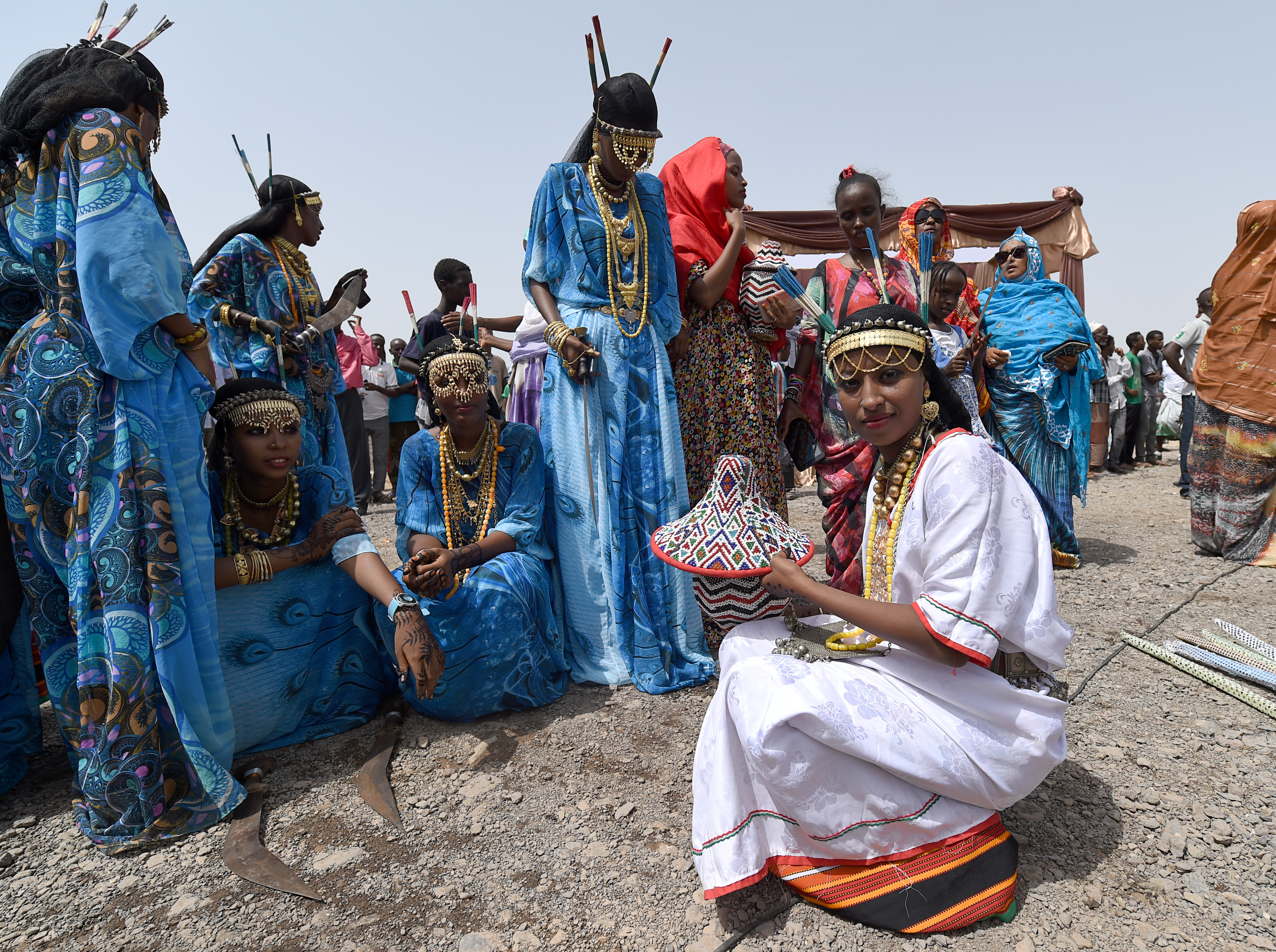
Tadjourah women rest after dancing for the 21st Sultan of Gobaad

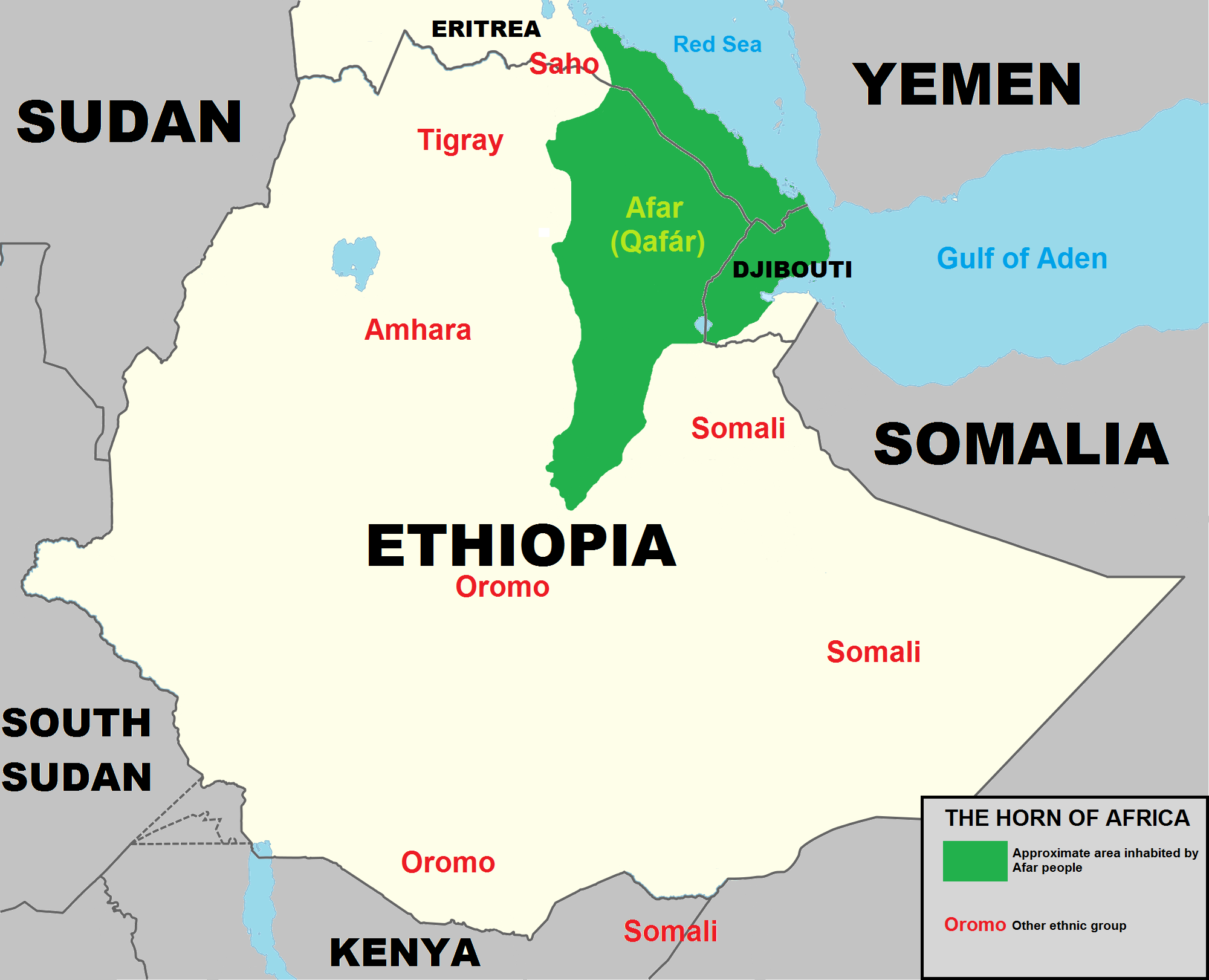
Approximate area inhabited by the Afar ethnic group.

The Afar principally reside in the Danakil Desert in the Afar Region of Ethiopia, as well as in Eritrea and Djibouti. They number 2,276,867 people in Ethiopia (or 2.73% of the total population), of whom 105,551 are urban inhabitants, according to the most recent census (2007). The Afar make up over a third of the population of Djibouti, and are one of the nine recognized ethnic divisions (kililoch) of Ethiopia.

=== Language ===
ISO 639 icon for the Afar language

Afars speak the Afar language as a mother tongue. It is part of the Cushitic branch of the Afroasiatic language family.

The Afar language is spoken by ethnic Afars in the Afar Region of Ethiopia, as well as in southern Eritrea and northern Djibouti. However, since the Afar are traditionally nomadic herders, Afar speakers may be found further afield.

Together, with the Saho language, Afar constitutes the Saho–Afar dialect cluster.

== Society ==
=== Religion ===
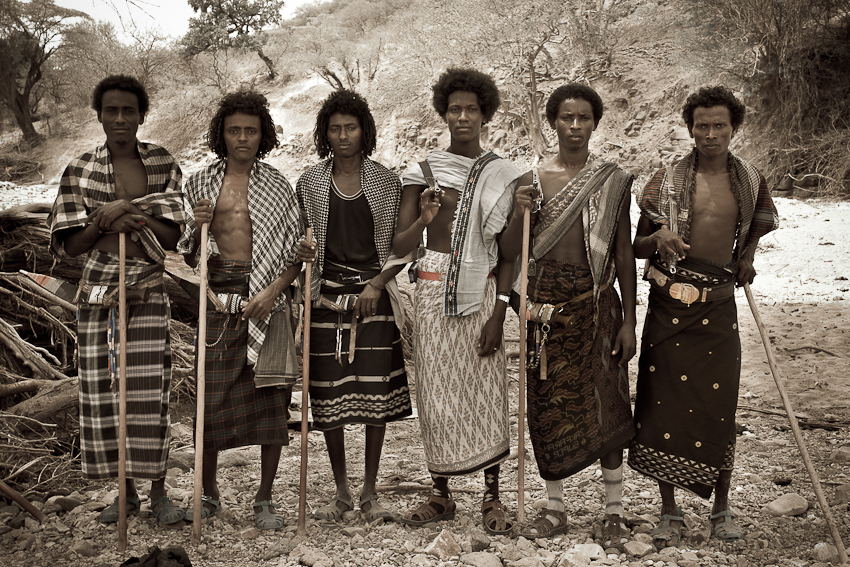
A group of young Afar men in traditional clothing

The Afar are predominantly Muslim. They have a long association with Islam through the various local Muslim polities and practice the Sunni branch of Islam. The majority of the Afar had adopted Islam by the 13th century due to the expanding influence of holy men and traders from the Arabian peninsula. The Afar mainly follow the Shafi'i school of Sunni Islam. Sufi orders like the Qadiriyya are also widespread among the Afar. Afar religious life is somewhat syncretic with a blend of Islamic concepts and pre-Islamic ones such as rain sacrifices on sacred locations, divination, and folk healing.

=== Culture ===
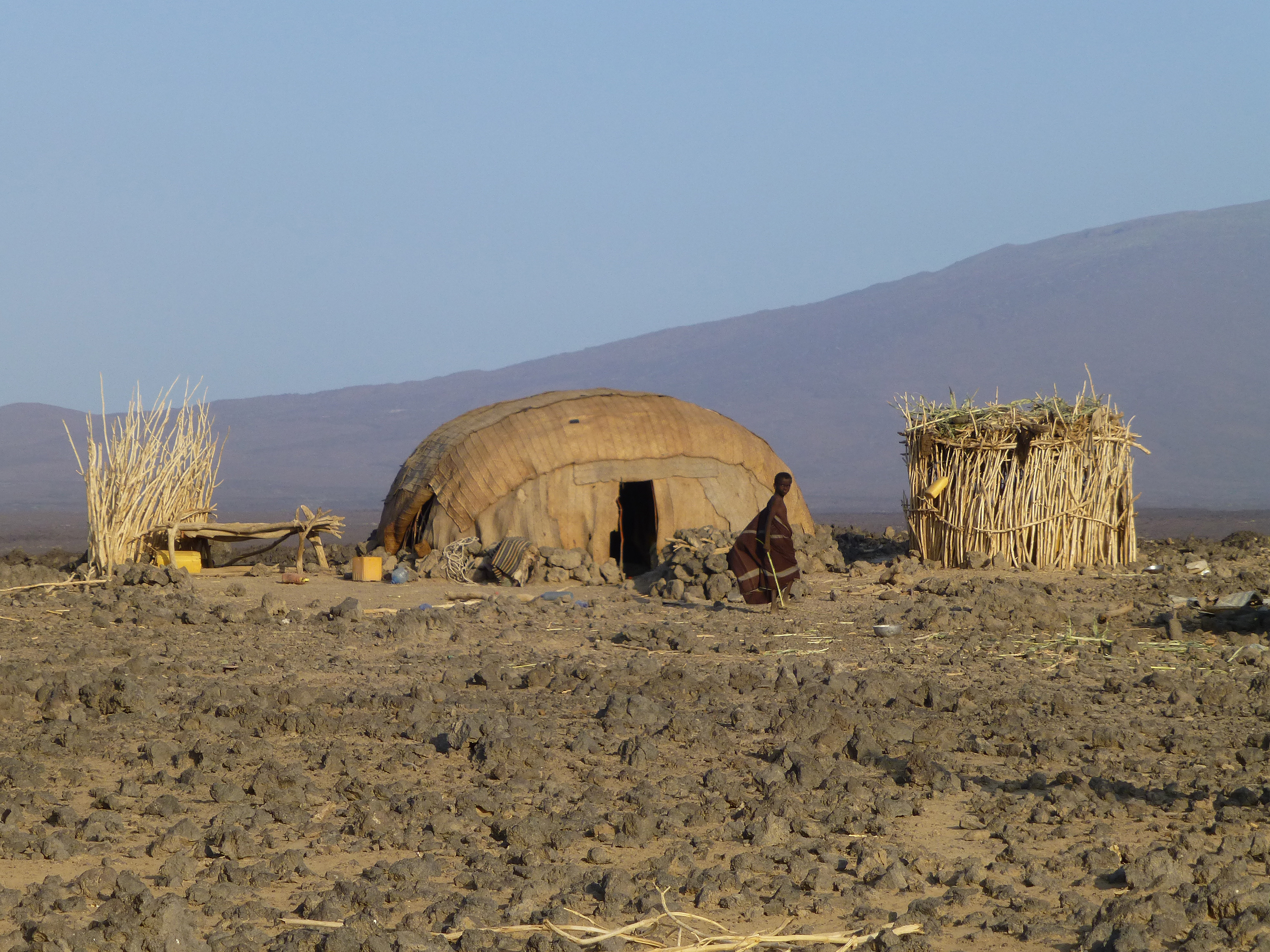
A traditional Afar dwelling in the Danakil Desert

Socially, they are organized into clan families led by elders and two main classes: the asaimara ('reds') who are the dominant class politically, and the adoimara ('whites') who are a working class and are found in the Mabla Mountains. Clans can be fluid and even include outsiders (like the Issa clan).

In addition, the Afar are reputed for their martial prowess. Men traditionally carry the jile, a famous curved knife. They also have an extensive repertoire of battle songs.

The Afar are mainly livestock holders, primarily raising camels but also tending to goats, sheep, and cattle. However, shrinking pastures for their livestock and environmental degradation have made some Afar instead turn to cultivation, migrant labor, and trade. The Ethiopian Afar have traditionally engaged in salt trading but recently Tigrayans have taken much of this occupation.

== See also ==
- Afar–Somali clashes
- Afar Depression
- Aussa Sultanate
- Kwosso
- Mudaito Dynasty
