= Asaita =

Town in Afar Region, Ethiopia

Aysaqiita አሳይታ (Amharic)
- Town
- Asaita
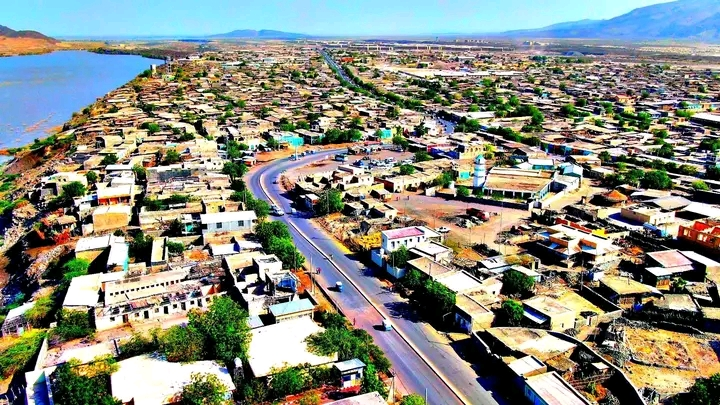
- Motto: Aysaqiiti Magaalah Xiinisso
- Location within Ethiopia Location within the Horn of Africa Location within Africa
- Coordinates: 11°34′N 41°26′E
- Country: Ethiopia
- Region: Afar Region
- Zone: Awsi Rasu
- Named for: Aysa'eeta meaning foundation or meaning "just leave" or Qeysa qiyte meaning "Eysa holler"

Government
  - Type: City administration
  - Mayor: Mohammed Ahmed
- Elevation: 300 m (980 ft)

Population (2005)
  - Total: 22,718 (est)
- Climate: BWh

Asaita (Amharic: አሳይታ, Asayəta; Afar: Aysaqiita), known historically as Aussa or Awsa, is a town in northeastern Ethiopia, and until 2007 served as the capital of the Afar Region of Ethiopia. Located in the Afambo woreda, part of the region's Awsi Rasu zone, the town has a latitude and longitude of 11°34′N 41°26′E and an elevation of 300 metres (980 ft).

Aussa was known by its full known name Aussa Gurêle which was founded upon a rock bound by the rivers Awash, Raheita and Assab. According to Huntingford's opinion the term Gurêle represented the name of a hill 90 miles north-west of Lake Abbe.

Asaita was briefly the capital of the Adal Sultanate and Imamate of Aussa as well as seat of the Aussa Sultanate, the chief Afar monarchy, but is 50 kilometres (31 mi) south by unpaved road from Awash–Asseb highway. A telephone line from Kombolcha to Asaita was in operation in 1964. The town of Semera, a planned settlement situated squarely on this highway, at some point before 2007 became the new capital of the region.

To the southeast of Asaita, located at the southern edge of the Danakil Desert, are a group of twenty salt lakes which cover the territory to the border with neighboring Djibouti. These lakes include Lake Gummare, known for its flamingos, and Lake Abbe, the final destination of the Awash River.

Based on figures from the Central Statistical Agency in 2005, the town has an estimated total population of 22,718, of whom 12,722 were males and 9,996 were females. According to the 1994 national census, the town had a population of 15,475.

== History ==
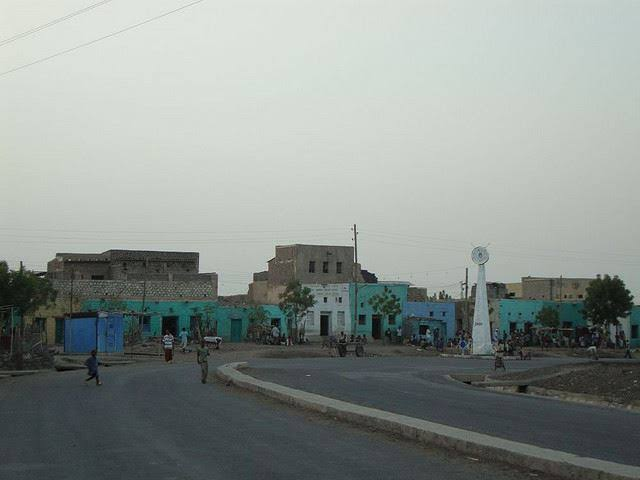
Asaita town, Afar Region.

In its early history Aussa appears to neighbor the powerful Mora state in medieval times. Aussa was once home to the extinct Harla people, their moniker still exists within clans in rural areas. Aussa is unique to the Afar region since it is the only area today that Afar people are engaged in agriculture. Farming was established by Harla as far back as the fourteenth century. The town also seems to have been a haven for mutineers of the Harari kingdom early on.

In the middle of the 16th century Aussa is mentioned in texts as part of the Harar based Adal Sultanate, the ruler of Aussa in this period was known as Hegano. Aussa became prominent when it served as capital of the Adal Sultanate in 1577. After Adal's demise, the Imamate of Aussa was established by Hararis and continued ruling the southern parts of Afar region until they were overthrown in the eighteenth century by the Mudaito dynasty of Afar who later established the Sultanate of Aussa.

In 1960 it was reported Aussa consisted of numerous clans with various origins, who each had a religious leader with the title Kabirto, Sharifa, Saido or Harara.

Asaita was flooded by the Awash River in August 1954, and again in September, 1998.

In late June 1971 a fight during the market between the Afar and highland people left 16 workers dead and 34 wounded. Of more than 1,000 small farmers who had moved from the highlands to Awsa there were only 250-300 still living in Asaita after the violence.

In March 1975 the Derg nationalized all rural lands, including those of Ras Bitwoded Alimirah Hanfadhe, Sultan of the Afar. When they offered to fly him to Addis Ababa to negotiate the transfer of his lands, he refused the offer. That June, the Derg dispatched a battalion of troops to capture the sultan. Although the Ottaways note their sources agree that the ensuing two-day battle was a "massacre", they differ in the details:

The sultan claimed that the army killed as many as 1,000 Afar in the attack and alleged that airplanes and armoured cars had been used. The government said that the massacre was carried out by the sultan's forces which incited the Afar to turn against non-Afar highland plantation workers at Dit Bahari, killing 221 persons. Probably the death toll lay somewhere between the two figures and the victims included both Afar and highlanders.

Jon Kalb, who was working in the Afar region at the time, provides a narrative which reconciles the two accounts. According to Kalb, Ras Alimirah had fled in May across the border to Djibouti, where his brother-in-law was in charge.

Apparently the flight coincided with a preemptive strike by the Afar on several key bridges and military garrisons to aid the Sultan's [Alimirah] escape. The ensuing attack on the Tendaho Plantation by the Afar, and the killing of the several hundred highlanders, may have also been a spontaneous reaction by the Awsa population to the news that the Sultan had been forced to flee. Whatever the cause, the retaliation by the military was predictably brutal. A battalion of troops was sent to Awsa... [and] a two-day battle ensued, during which a reported 1000 Afar were killed in and around Aysaita.

Following the fall of the Derg, Ras Alimirah, who had in the meantime founded the Afar Liberation Front (ALF), returned to Asaita with his son, Hanfadhe Alimirah. However, on 8 November 1995, Ethiopian People's Revolutionary Democratic Front (EPRDF) troops surrounded their family residence in Assayita, then after exchanging gunfire overpowered Alimirah's guards, and entered the residence, where they confiscated weapons and other items. According to observers, this action against the Sultan and the ALF was another effort to reduce his influence in the Afar Region. Despite the EPRDF's persistent efforts to bring the group under its control, the ALF is said to have remained independent.

== Climate ==
Asaita is located in the central part of Afar Region and has a hot arid climate (Köppen BWh) with very high temperatures year-round. What rain occurs mostly falls in April and July-August.

Climate data for Asaita
Month	Jan	Feb	Mar	Apr	May	Jun	Jul	Aug	Sep	Oct	Nov	Dec	Year
Mean daily maximum °C (°F)	32.7 (90.9)	34.1 (93.4)	36.5 (97.7)	38.4 (101.1)	41.0 (105.8)	42.3 (108.1)	40.8 (105.4)	39.5 (103.1)	39.2 (102.6)	37.0 (98.6)	34.6 (94.3)	32.8 (91.0)	37.4 (99.3)
Daily mean °C (°F)	25.7 (78.3)	26.8 (80.2)	28.9 (84.0)	30.8 (87.4)	32.8 (91.0)	34.5 (94.1)	33.2 (91.8)	32.1 (89.8)	32.1 (89.8)	29.9 (85.8)	27.6 (81.7)	25.9 (78.6)	30.0 (86.0)
Mean daily minimum °C (°F)	18.7 (65.7)	19.5 (67.1)	21.3 (70.3)	23.2 (73.8)	24.7 (76.5)	26.6 (79.9)	25.6 (78.1)	24.8 (76.6)	25.0 (77.0)	22.9 (73.2)	20.5 (68.9)	19.1 (66.4)	22.7 (72.8)
Average rainfall mm (inches)	4.0 (0.16)	4.9 (0.19)	10.5 (0.41)	25.5 (1.00)	4.8 (0.19)	3.7 (0.15)	24.0 (0.94)	41.8 (1.65)	10.9 (0.43)	4.0 (0.16)	3.6 (0.14)	3.0 (0.12)	140.7 (5.54)
Source: Ethiopian Meteorological Institute
