= Timeline of Harar =

This is timeline of Harar, a city in eastern Ethiopia from the initial history to present.

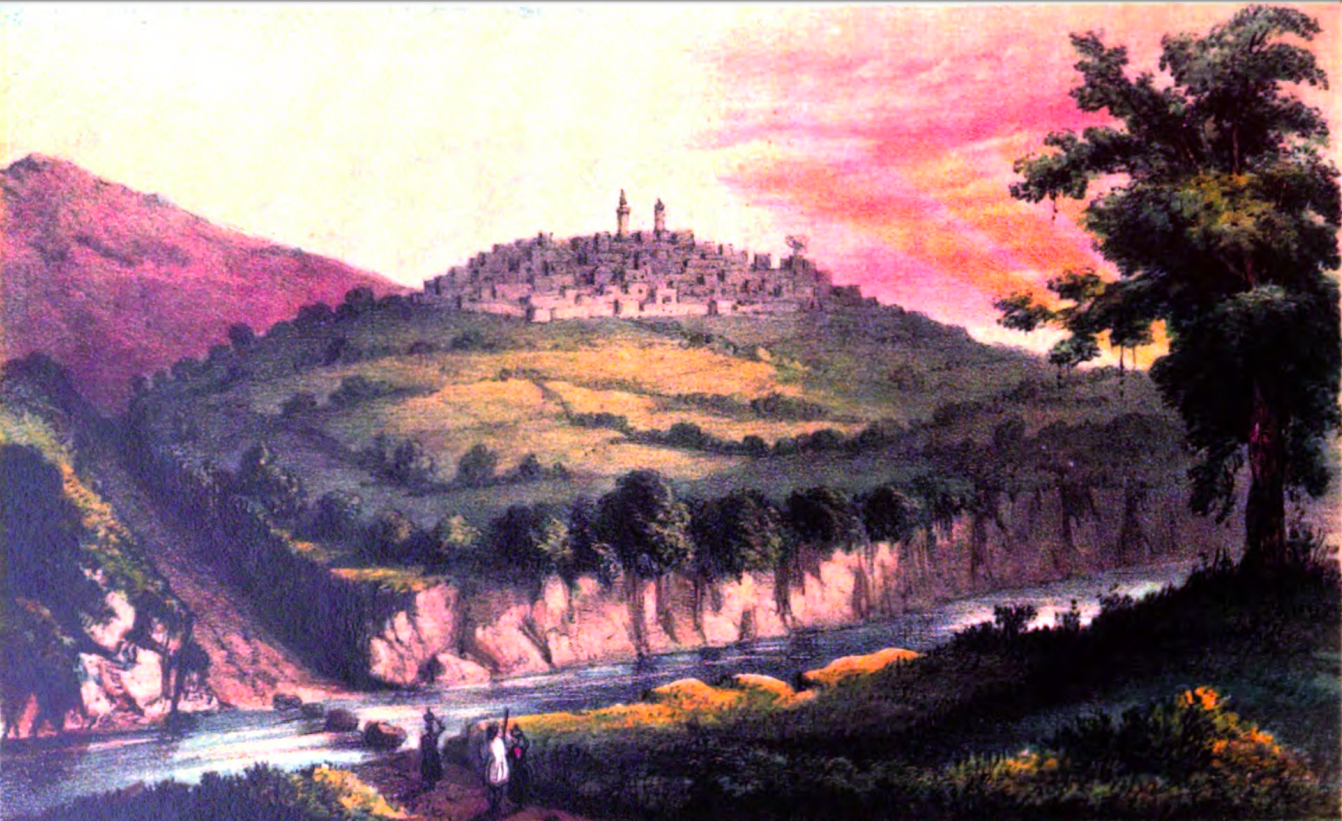
Harar landscape depicted by Sir Richard Francis Burton, 1856

== History ==
- 1216 – According to the Fath Medīnat Harar, the legendary saint Abadir Umar ar-Rida, along with several religious leaders, came from the Arabian Peninsula to settle in the Harar plateau, where Abadir was supposedly met by the Harla, Gaturi and Argobba people.
- 14th century – the chronicle of Ethiopian Emperor Amda Seyon stated that Gēt (Gēy) was a colony in the Harla colony.
- 1520 – Harar became the capital of Adal Sultanate under Sultan Abu Bakr ibn.
- 1647 – the Emirate of Harar was founded when the Harari people refused to accept Imām 'Umardīn Ādam as their ruler. It was broken away to Aussa Sultanate to form their own state under `Ali in Da `ud.
- 1789 – the Emirate issued the first coins, and went increasingly into the nineteenth century.
- 1875 – In the name of scientific expedition, Muhammad Rauf Pasha led an Egyptian force from Zeila into the interior of southeast Ethiopia.
- 11 October 1875 – Harar was occupied by the Egyptian army.
- 1880-1891 - French poet Arthur Rimbaud established himself as a trader in Harar. He was only the third European ever to set foot in the city, and the first to do business there.
- 1885 – Harar regained its independence under Amir Abdullahi.
- 1886 - Emirate of Harar troops defeat Abyssinian army of Menelik II at the Battle of Hirna
- 9 January 1887 – Harar was ultimately conquered by Emperor Menelik II at the Battle of Chelenqo.
- 1892 – Harar bears the current name.
- 1902 – As Harar lost its commercial importance with the creation of French built Addis Ababa–Djibouti Railway, Dire Dawa was founded as the New Harar.
- 8 May 1936 – Harar was captured by Italian troops under Marshall Rodolfo Graziani during the Second Italo-Ethiopian War.
- 29 March 1941 – the 1st battalion of the Nigeria Regiment, advancing from Jijiga by the way of the Marda Pass, captured Harar for the allies.
- 1944 – Following Anglo-Ethiopian Agreement, the British decided to open consulate in Harar, although not reciprocating the Ethiopian one at Hargeisa.
- March 1960 – After reports of the British violated the London Agreement of 1954, the Ethiopian Ministry of Foreign Affairs ordered the consulate closed.
- October 1977 – the Battle of Harar took place between Ethiopia under the military junta Derg, and Somalia and the Western Somali Liberation Front (WSLF), with the former supported by the Soviet–Cuban soldiers.
- 21 June 1991 – Following the capture of EPRDF from the Derg, Harar along with Afar and Somali Region delayed regional elections.
- 30 June 2020 – the Statue of Haile Selassie’s father in Harar was toppled by Oromo protestors during the Hachalu Hundessa riots.
