= Early history of Harar =

History of Harar city prior to 1887

Early history of Harar city is generally obscure, as many documents and records differ the exact date of the origin of the city. Most historical records state that Harar's history date back to 16th century, beginning with Adal Sultanate moving its capital from Dakkar to Harar during the reign of Sultan Abu Bakr ibn Muhammad. Other rudimentary oral tradition produced in 19th and 20th century stated that Harar history dated by in the 10th century or Abadir Umar ar-Rida founded the first Harar kingdom after migrating from Arabian Peninsula to spread Islam in 12th and 13th century.

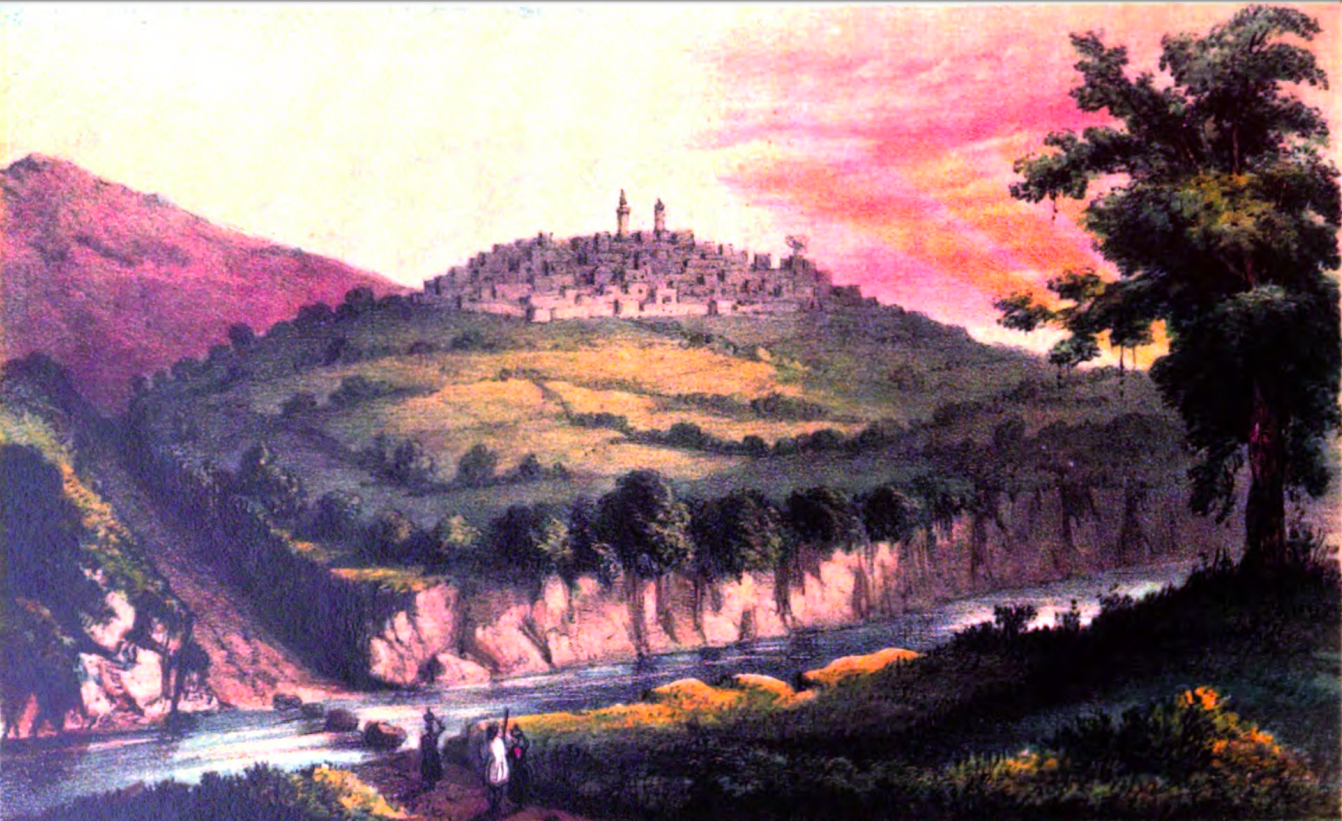
Harar and the surrounding countryside illustration by Sir Richard Francis Burton (1856).

In 1647, Emirate of Harar was established when Harari people refused to accept Imam Umar Din as their ruler after broke up from Aussa Sultanate to form their own state under Ali ibn Da'ud. The emirate persisted under sovereign until Egyptian invasion in 1874, and the British take over of Egypt, ultimately under Hewett Treaty, the Emirate ceded to the Ethiopian Empire in exchange of assistance against Mahdist Sudan. The Emirate eventually defeated at the Battle of Chelenqo in 1887 by Ethiopian armies guided under Negus Menelik II, incorporated to the Ethiopian Empire.

== Accounts ==
According to historical texts, Muslim city of Harar was dated back to 16th century. In 1521, Sultan Barr Sa'd ad-din sultanate moved his capital from Dakkar to Harar. In the same century, Amir Nur built defense wall named jegol around Harar. According to some oral tradition produced in 19th and 20th century, the founding history of Harar goes behind in 13th century or 10th century. Modern oral tradition agreed only the founder of Harar was Abadir Umar ar-Rida, who migrated from Arab Peninsula in the 12th and 13th century to spread Islam. Harar widely mentioned during the reign of Ethiopian emperor Amda Seyon I (1314–1344) while Muslim sheiks appeared to the region and most emperors chronicle had described Harar as their victories against the Ifat Sultanate in the east.

In 18th and 19th century, three handwritten documents published in Amharic, Arabic and French described Harar being liberated by Dawud dynasty from Imamate of Aussa in 1647 and ruled until Egyptian conquest in 1875.

== History ==
=== Walashma dynasty ===
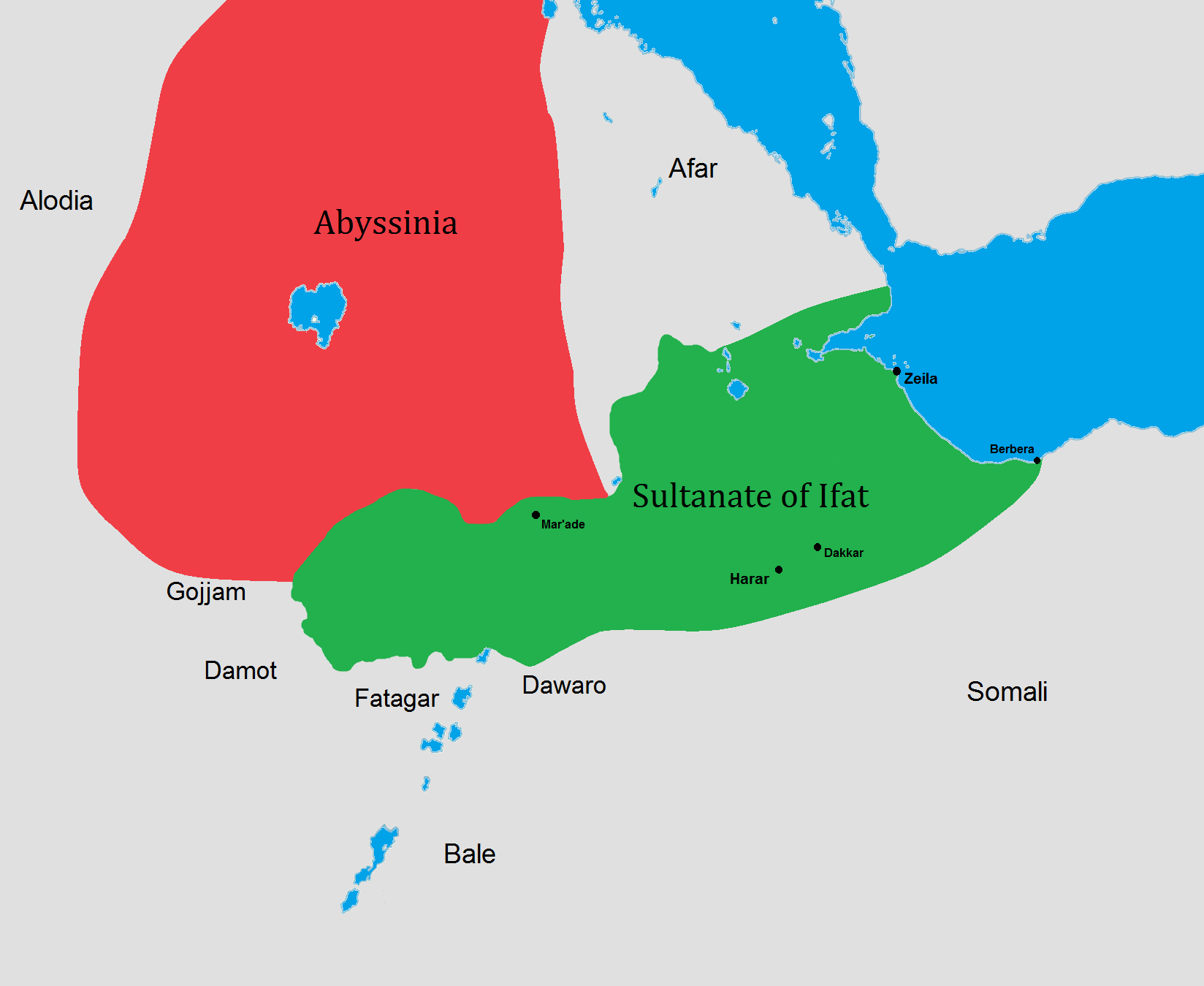
Sultanate of Ifat at its extent with Ethiopian (Abyssinian) Empire in red

The imams of Harar came to conflict with Walasma ruling classes that exacerbate the conflict through preaching the rulers for their reluctance to fulfill their religious duty. The religious party heightened its power by 16th century and able to intervene the country's policy. Meanwhile, Mahfuz, governor of Zeila/Harar, raid toward Ethiopia without consent of the Walashma ruler Muhammad bin Azharaddin, who wanted to maintain relations with the Christians. Thus, the event sparked the Ethiopian–Adal War (1529–1543). During the conflict, the Somalis sided with the extinct Harla people, Afar, Argobba, Hadiya forces along with Turkish and Arab gunmen, with both use of Maya mercenaries.

=== Sultanate of Harar ===
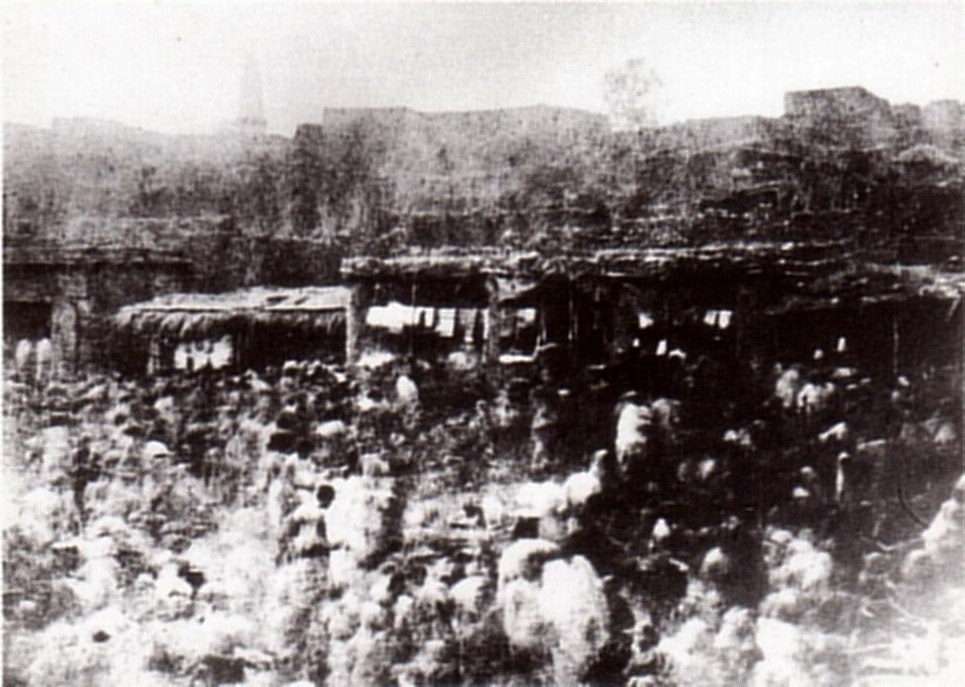
Market place in Harar, 1883

Harar formed its Sultanate after the death of Ahmad ibn Ibrahim al-Ghazi at the Battle of Wayna Daga in 1543, by the aid of Nur ibn Mujahid, who proclaimed himself Amir or Sultan of Harar. Nur spent majority of his role renovating Harar and creating great wall around Harar. Shortly after assumption to the throne, he married widow of Ahmed Ibrahim, Bati del Wambara, who helped him to be self-reliant against confronting Ethiopian forces. After the death of Gerad Abbas, Ethiopian Emperor Gelawdewos invaded surrounding kingdoms except for Harari, including Dawaro, Fatagar, Bale, and Hadiya. Interestingly, Gelawdewos headed to Kaffa province after which Nur ibn Mujahid declared a jihad. Nur took a lot of damage in his first campaign, it took him nine years to recover, in 1559 he assembled an army of 1800 horsemen and 500 riflemen and numerous swords- and bowmen, this time he was successful and invaded Fatagar.

During series campaigns against each territories, Gelawdewos sent the governor of Kambata and Ras Fasil to destroy Harar. After finding out Nur marches to Fatagar, the two governors sacked Harar; Gelawdewos was shot by Harari rifleman and eventually battered to death while fighting Harari cavalry at the Battle of Fatagar on 23 March 1559.

=== Emirate of Harar ===
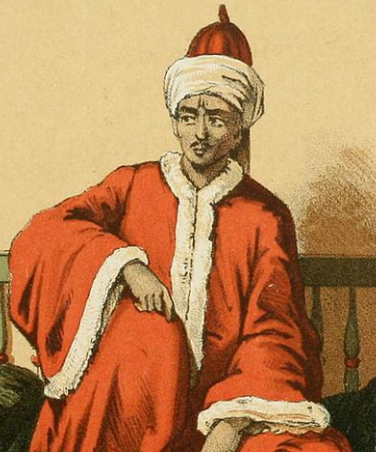
Harar emir Ahmad III during Richard Burton's visit to Harar in 1855

Emirate of Harar emerged in 1647 when Harari people refused to accept Imam Umar Din as their ruler after broke up from Aussa Sultanate to form their own state under Ali ibn Da'ud. According to League of Nations prior to Emperor Menelik II invasion to the kingdom, the Harar kingdom made up of area stretching Awash and Shebelle while Ogaden was a tributary state. Originally, this kingdom comprised the present day Somaliland and south of eastern Ethiopia including Arsi province.

Harar has been trading spot to Shewa region via Zeila and Barbara, linked by Aliyu Amba. Foreign citizens were also involved in local business, mostly Armenians, Greeks, Indians, Syrians, Italians and several Egyptians engaged in selling cotton, cloth, clothing, glassware, brass and copper, drinks and preserves. Locally produced woven clothing, earrings, bracelets, wax, butter, honey, mules, sorghum, wheat karanji (a bread used by travellers), ghee and all kinds of tallow were imported to Harar and exported to other parts of the world. Other monopolized items like ivory, ostrich feathers and musk were exported. Khat was widely transported through Aden with market price of quarter rupees per parcel.

Trading stability dwindled in the 19th century due to lack of resources and famine. Like other Muslim sultanates, the Emirate technically under control of Ottoman Empire. In 1875, Harari was annexed by Egypt and the British defeated the Khedivate, seizing its territory including Harar. They evacuated Harar and ceded to the Ethiopian Empire in exchange of assistance against Mahdist Sudan. In accordance with Hewett Treaty, the British left Harar to the son of former Emir of Harar with a few hundred rifles, some cannon and a handful of British trained officers. The Emirate eventually sacked by armies of Negus Menelik II at the Battle of Chelenqo in 1887.
