= Fedis (historical region) =

Historic state in Horn of Africa

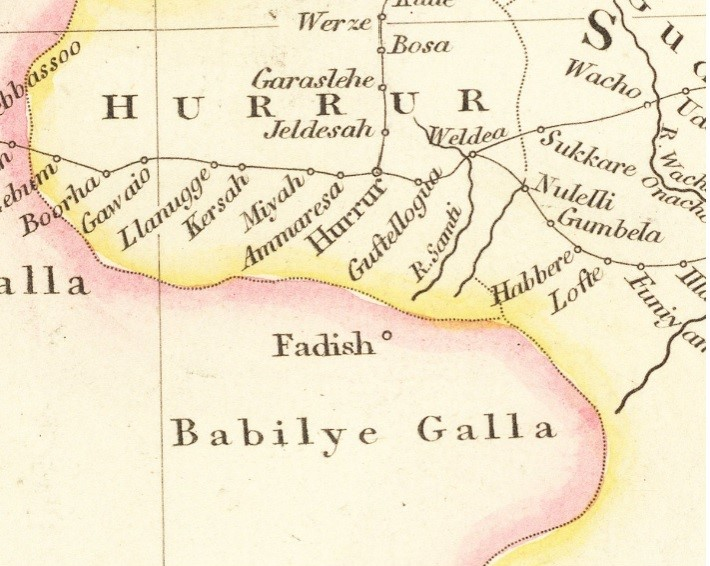
Fadis in Babile Oromo territory of the Emirate of Harar circa 1832

Fedis (Harari: ፈዲስ) was a historical region mentioned as far back as the fourteenth century. It was located in modern eastern Ethiopia, south of Harar city.

== History ==
Historically part of the Adal region, Fedis was first mentioned in the fourteenth century chronicles of Amda Seyon during his invasion of Ifat Sultanate.

In the later half of the seventeenth century it was the domain of the Emirate of Harar. According to the Harar emirate documents from the nineteenth century, minerals such as copper were extracted from the region and transported to Harar city.

In the early 1800s emir ʽAbd ar-Rahman ibn Muhammad was taken to Fedis as prisoner by the Oromo following his unsuccessful attempt to extract tax from them, this led to his brother emir ʽAbd al-Karim ibn Muhammad seizing the throne in 1825. In 1827 Fedis became a battleground between Oromo factions who supported the aforementioned princes of Harar which devastated three settlements in the region. By the late 1800s, Fedis Oromo state Islam had been firmly established among them following emir Muhammad ibn Ali dispatching a Harari Muslim scholar to teach religion and construct a mosque. In 1885, Fedis was one of the several regions that consented to pay taxes to the Emirate of Harar under emir Abdullahi II after the kingdom was restored from the Egyptian occupation.

Following the severe drought of 1974, the Ethiopian government constructed dams in the area. During the Ogaden War in the 70s, Fedis was a battleground between Ethiopian and Somali forces. It was briefly occupied by the rebel group WSLF with support from Oromo locals.

Fedis is the site of one of the largest market places in the region where goods are sold, the others being Harar and Babile. The narcotic Khat leaf grown in Fedis is most sought after by the elites in the Horn of Africa. A shrine dedicated to saint Aw Barkhadle is also located near this town.

== Ruins ==
A stepwell ascribed to the ancient Harla people by the denizens of Fedis was discovered by archaeologists in 2011:

The inhabitants attribute the stepwell at Melka site to the Harla people. They also believe that its architects designed it to conserve drinking water for themselves, their plants and their animals during the dry season. This function continues into the present. The locals call it “Laga Gollo Wadassaa”, referring to “river” (laga), the locality (Gollo) and Cordia africana, a species of tree known in English as Sudan teak (wadassaa).

According to archaeologist Timothy Insoll, there are also apparent indications suggesting the presence of a town featuring defensive fortifications, a mosque, and burial grounds.
