= Malassay =

Former elite military unit of the Adal Sultanate

- Active: 1100–1600
- Allegiance: Adal Sultanate
- Type: Infantry, Cavalry
- Role: Standing professional military
- Garrisons: Harar
- Engagements: Battle of Ansata, Battle of Hubat, Battle of Shimbra Kure, Battle of Fatagar, Battle of Hazalo, Battle of Endagabatan, Battle of Hadiya

Commanders
- Commander: Garad

A Malassay (Harari: መለሳይ Mäläsay, Somali: Maalasay) was a member of the elite cavalry units that formed the Adal Sultanate's household troops. According to Manfred Kropp, Malassay were the Harari armed forces.

== Etymology ==
Malassay appears to refer to a military rank or warrior in Afar and Harari languages. According to Duri Mohammed, Malassay in ancient times referred to Harari soldiers, however in the present day it refers to a brotherhood or member of a fraternity. According to Harari scholar Abdurrahman Qorram and others, Malassay derives from the root Harari terms "mälä" (ways and means/solution) and "say" (wealth/prosperity).” German historian Manfred Kropp, suggests that it may be associated with the Harari title Malak.

== History ==
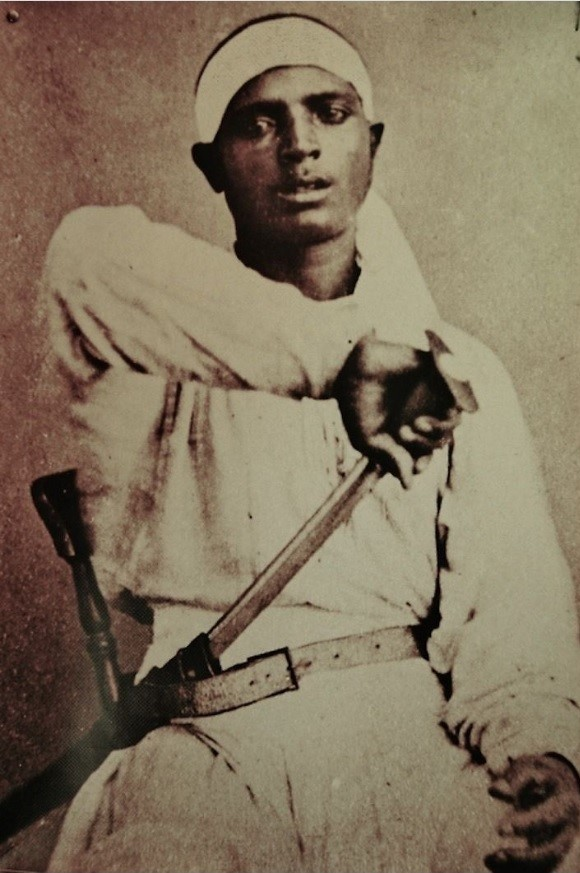
Photo of Harari warrior in 1883 taken by Arthur Rimbaud

Early Ge'ez and Portuguese texts indicate Muslim soldiers were known as the Malassay. In the thirteenth century the Malassay appear to back the Amhara rebel Yekuno Amlak in his conflict with the Zagwe dynasty. Historians have identified the Gafat regiments of the Malassay played a key role in founding the Christian Solomonic dynasty.

Ahmad ibn Ibrahim al-Ghazi was originally a Malassay serving under a Garad named Abun Adashe prior to becoming leader of the Adal Sultanate. In the sixteenth century the main troops of Adal Sultanate's leader Ahmad ibn Ibrahim al-Ghazi were the Malassay during the Ethiopian-Adal war. According to Mohammed Hassen the Malassay under Ahmed consisted of the Harla and Harari ethnic groups. Emperor Lebna Dengel chronicles states the Malassay alongside Qecchin were the Muslim enemy that invaded. A few notable Malassay were Amir Husain bin Abubaker the Gaturi and Alus the Hegano of Sim during Adal's conflict with the Abyssinians. According to sixteenth century Adal writer Arab Faqīh, the Malassay participated in the conquest of Abyssinia at the decisive Battle of Shimbra Kure. Ethiopian historian Merid Wolde Aregay has connected the Harari people, who are Semitic speakers of the Harar region, to the Malassay Adalite mounted troops that played a key role in the battle at Shimbre Kure.

In the reign of Emperor Sarsa Dengel, the Hadiya Kingdom was supported by 500 Malassay donning cuirass who had arrived from Harar territory to battle Ethiopia. Sarsa Dengel chronicles mentions Malassay rebels of Elmag (an unidentified group) and the Somali under their Harari moniker Tumur had deserted thus Manfred Kropp argues the Malassay were of diverse ethnic backgrounds.

Under the seventeenth century Emirate of Harar, the entire army was commanded by a Garad who had several militias under him labeled the Malassay. In the contemporary era, the term Malassay survives as a subgroup of the Harari people. According to Umar, Malga-Gello the forefather of the Siltʼe people's clan Ulbareg was a captain of the Malassay.

== Places ==
Ammoy Malasay, village in Ifat, Ethiopia

== See also ==
- Pre-modern special forces
- Harari people
- Afar people
- Garad
