= Ahmad II ibn Muhammad =

Ahmad II ibn Muhammad أمير أبو الرحمن بن محمد
- 12th Emir of Harar
- Reign: 1794 - 1821
- Predecessor: ʽAbd al-Shakur ibn Yusuf
- Successor: `Abd al-Karim ibn Muhammad
- Born: 1770s Harar-Gey
- Died: 1821; Harar-Gey
- Dynasty: Ali ibn Dawud Dynasty
- Religion: Sunni Islam

Ahmad II ibn Muhammad was Emir of Harar, in eastern Ethiopia (1794–1821), and grandnephew of Emir Ahmad I ibn Abi Bakr. He made several successful military expeditions against the Oromo around the city of Harar, which probably helped in keeping the trade routes open to the west toward Shewa and the east toward Zeila. On his death in 1821, his brothers `Abd ar-Rahman ibn Muhammad and `Abd al-Karim ibn Muhammad fought over the succession.

== See also ==
- List of emirs of Harar
- Harar
