= Chelenqo =

Town in Oromia Region, Ethiopia

Coordinates: 9°23′53″N 41°33′39″E

Chelenqo is a town in eastern Ethiopia located in the Oromia region a few km west of Harar. It was historically located in the Chercher region of Harar.

== History ==
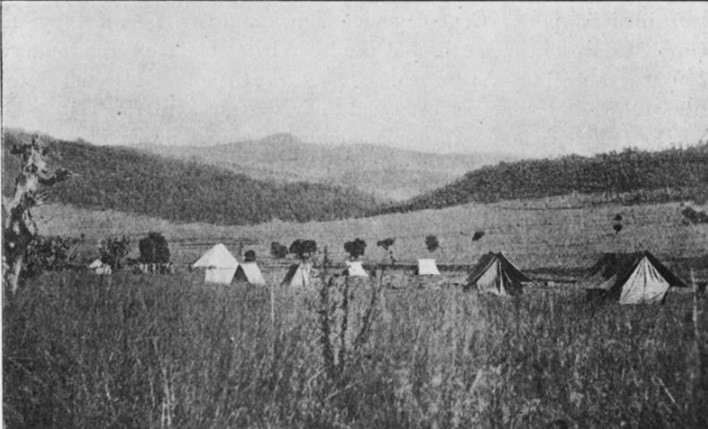
Photo of Chelenqo town in the 1900s by Herbert Weld Blundell

The town is linked to the Middle Ages during the reign of the Makhzumi dynasty as engravings in the area date back to the 13th century. Chelenqo is also part of an ancient bartering route in the region which consists of livestock vendors.

In 1887 the Battle of Chelenqo took place between the Emirate of Harar and the Abyssinian state of Shewa following the latter's invasion. Skeletal remains belonging to the fallen soldiers of Harar emir Amir Abdullahi II were visible in Chelenqo until recently. In the neighboring Harari Regional State "the Chelenqo Martyrs" day is observed based on this conflict.

French writer Hugues Le Roux upon visiting Chelenqo in the early 1900s, described it as possessing spectacular cornfields encircled by mountains.

In 2018, sixteen peaceful Oromo protestors were gunned down by Ethiopian National Defense Force in Chelenqo which forced the Oromia president Lemma Megersa to criticize the federal governments actions.
