= Sim (historical region) =

Historic state in modern Ethiopia

Sim (Harari: ሴም Sém) (sometimes spelled Sem) was a historical Muslim state located around present-day eastern Ethiopia. The Adalite chronicle from the sixteenth century references Sim as one of the regions of Adal, alongside Shewa, Nagab, Gidaya, and Dakkar.

== History ==
In the sixteenth century, the governor of Sim was Adalite Ahmad ibn Ibrahim al-Ghazi, conqueror of Abyssinia. Historian Mohammed Hassen states that Sim was located in the Harla country and that Ahmad ibn Ibrahim al-Ghazi's father previously held the position of administrator (Garad) of Sim. During the Ethiopian-Adal war, the people of Sim were associated with the Malassay cavalry unit of the Adal Sultanate. Subsequent to the Battle of Webi River involving Adal and Abyssinia, the chronicles of Emperor Sarsa Dengel suggest that it was the Garad of Sim who betrayed the Adal Sultan Muhammad ibn Nasir and handed him to the emperor.

As per the chronicles of Aussa, the Garad of Sim Umardin revolted against the Imam of Aussa, prompting the Sim Garad to incite the Somalis to plunder Zeila and inflict damage upon its walls. In the late sixteenth century, the Harar chronicles suggest that the Sim, along with other states like Hargaya and Gidaya, would face destruction due to famine and the Oromo invasions. During the initial decades of the eighteenth century, Ali Hegan, an offspring of the Sim Garad lineage, is documented as participating among the nobility at a convocation convened by Emīr Ṭalḥa ibn ʿAbdullah of the Emirate of Harar.

In the early 1800s, documents from the Emirate of Harar reference a meeting between Sim Garad Mohammed and emir Abu Bakr II ibn ʽAbd al-Munan. Historian Abdurahman Garad notes that Garad Mohammed was identified by British officer Richard Burton as the Wazir of the Harar state during his visit to Harar city. According to German historian Manfred Kropp, the Semgarad (Garad of Sim) also had authority over the Malassay army within the Emirate of Harar.

== Inhabitants ==
According to historian Merid Wolde Aregay, the people of the state spoke the Harari language.
