= Battle of Hirna =

1886 battle between the Ethiopian Empire and Emirate of Harar

- Part of Menelik's Expansions
Date	October 1886
Location	Hirna, Chercher, Emirate of Harar
Result	Harari victory

Belligerents
(Ethiopian Empire) Shewa	Emirate of Harar

Commanders and leaders
Dejazmach Walda Gabriel	Bakri Salih

The Battle of Hirna was an engagement fought in October 1886 between the Abyssinian army of Shewa under Dejazmach Walda Gabriel and officer Bakri Salih of the Emirate of Harar. The Shewan forces were routed.

== Background ==
In response to king Menelik's orders to occupy the Emirate of Harar, in September 1886 Dejazmach Wolde Gabriel a general of Menelik invaded the Emirate of Harar and occupied the Chercher area at Hirna however his army would be ambushed by the Emirate's troops.

According to Menelik's personal writer Guébré Sellassié, a substantial military force commanded by Walde Gabriel withdrew from Chercher in advance of potential combat engagement:

the chieftains who were with him said: “Since there are many cannons and rifles in Harar, we cannot go alone and fight without our master. We do not want to run the risk of being defeated and humiliated.“

== Battle ==
According to Harold G. Marcus, his army "was in poor shape, reduced to a relatively small number by sickness and desertions." A night attack by Emir 'Abd Allah's army routed the Dejazmach's force, sending them fleeing westward towards the Awash River. Ethiopian historian Bahru Zewde calls it a decisive victory for the emirate's troops.

Menelik's informant Asme Giyorgis, conceded the initial push towards Harar by Walda Gabryiel was a failure as the Amir's soldiers used fireworks to startle his men, forcing a retreat. Harari records report Walda Gabryiel's army were strategically pushed into a wheat field full of spikes which pierced their feet, immobilizing them.

== See also ==
- Battle of Chelenqo
