= Hegano =

Administrator or chief

Hegano (Harari: ሔገኖ) sometimes called Hegan, Haygan or Hayjan was an administrative title in the Horn of Africa.

== Etymology ==
According to historian Abdurahman Garad, Hegano is an extract from the root Harari word Hegan “lieutenant” or Hegana ”to proxy”. Its also utilized in a similar manner by the languages of Silt'e and Wolane people.

== History ==
Hegano first appears in the fifteenth century emperor Zara Yaqob chronicles which states the rulers of the Abyssinian provinces of Gabar-ge and Wej were designated by this term. It was also applied by the chiefs of Ganz province and linked to rulers of Bale.

According to sixteenth century Adal writer Arab Faqīh, a Malassay soldier of Adal Sultanate who participated in the Ethiopian-Adal war was styled Alus bin al-Haygan. During the Adalite occupation of Abyssinia the administrators of Ifat also held the title Hegano based on the Emirate of Harar chronicles. Towards the end of the sixteenth century the ruler of Aussa a subordinate of Harar based Adal Sultanate was known as Hegano Hashim.

In the early 1700s, Ali Hegan son of Garad of Sem is mentioned as one of the nobility in attendance to an assembly called by Emīr Ṭalḥa ibn ʿAbdullah of Emirate of Harar.

== See also ==
- Kabir
- Malak
