= Muhammad ibn 'Ali 'Abd ash-Shakur =

Muhammad ibn Ali Abd Ash-Shakur أمير محمد بن علي عبد الشكور
- 17th Emir of Harar
- Reign: 1856 – 1875
- Predecessor: Ahmad III ibn Abu Bakr
- Successor: Abdallah II
- Born: Harar-Gey
- Died: October 1875
- Dynasty: Ali ibn Dawud Dynasty
- Religion: Sunni Islam

Muhammad ibn 'Ali 'Abd ash-Shakur was Emir of Harar before the Egyptian conquest (1856–1875). He is remembered unfavorably by the Harari for favoring the neighboring Oromo people. His son the last emir of Harar, Abdullahi II would succeed him following the Egyptian interval.

== Rise to power ==
Muhammad claimed to be the grandson of Amir ʽAbd al-Shakur ibn Yusuf; however R. A. Caulk doubts this claim, observing that "the usurper who ruled Harar for nearly twenty years until deposed and murdered by the Egyptians was so directly descended from this or any other amir", agreeing with his Harari and Oromo informants that "his father, Ali, had merely adopted the name of his patron, Abd al-Shakur, and that he was really the son of a rich Anniya Oromo, Mayu, from the south-west of Harar." However this is disputed as the ancestral line of his father Mayu existed prior to the Oromo invasions. His father Ali had grown up at the court of Amir ʿAbdalshakūr, where he gained the favor of the Amir and was married to a relative of the Amir's wife Gisti Fatima. Muhammad distinguished himself in combat against the Oromo under ʿAbdalshakūr's successor Amir ʽAbd ar-Rahman ibn Muhammad, and was given the sister of Fatima, Kadija, as his wife.

In the oral traditions of the Harari, Muhammad was encouraged by his wife Kadija to organize a revolt against Amir Ahmad. He escaped arrest by fleeing the city in either 1854 or 1855 and found sanctuary amongst the Ala Oromo living beyond Gara Mullata mountain to the west. There he entered in an ilman gosa (adoptive brotherhood) with the Bokku of the Ala Oromo. Further, he married into the family of a prominent elder of the Ala Oromo, which gained him the support of a renowned warrior Kormoso. With this alliance, Muhammad marched on Harari, destroyed its gardens and lay siege to the city.

It was at this time that Amir Abu Bakr died, in August. The oldest son of the Amir was still a minor and unable to succeed his father. Over the next few days ephemeral Amirs were appointed by town assemblies, but in the end the citizens acceded to Muhammad and he became Amir 30 August 1856.

== Reign ==
Muhammad is said to have oppressed his own people by devaluing the city's currency while extracting a special mahalaq al-Oromo or Oromo tax. This tax was needed for Amir Muhammad to meet the demands of hospitality inherent in the status of ilman gosa. Richard Pankhurst also notes that Emir Muhammad forbade his subjects from eating rice or dates, "declaring that they were suitable only for rulers."

However, Caulk points that Muhammad engaged in a new policy: instead of simply keeping the Oromo at bay, he "made systematic efforts to convert them to Islam and extend their involvement in commercial agriculture; he thereby attempted to assimilate more of the Oromo and re-establish the balance on which the town's survival depended." Until the 1830s, only the Babile Oromo and groups of mixed Oromo-Somali ethnicity had been converted to Islam to any degree. Nonetheless, Muhammad lack the power to make much headway in this endeavor, and it was only after the Egyptian conquest that this policy made major strides.

== End ==
The native Harari appealed to Khedive Isma'il of Egypt, who then directed Ra'uf Pasha, in command of the military expedition that had annexed Zeila and Berbera to Egypt in 1870, to march on Harar. Ra'uf Pasha occupied Harar October 1875, according to Trimingham, "without encountering any resistance except for some from the Oromo tribes. So ended the independence of the city-state of Harar after less than two centuries." Two letters of Emir Muhammad survive, both dated 6 October 1875, to Ra'uf Pasha, which discuss the terms of the city's surrender. After the ratification of this treaty, a power struggle took place between the Emir Muhammed 'Abd ash-Shakur and Muhammed Ra'uf Pasha. The Emir supposedly refused to come and see Ra'uf Pasha on his request, since he felt that it was below him and it is the Egyptian who should come to him. Ra'uf Pasha sent soldiers after him and the emir was strangled in the ensuing struggle. Harari informants claim that, Ali Abu Bakr, a relative of the emir who was imprisoned due to their political rivalry, conspired against the deposed emir and treacherously convinced the Egyptians that the emir and his loyalists to open the city gates to Oromo warriors during the night on October 26, 1875, as it was a Muslim festival called the Night of Power. It was Harari tradition that on that festival drums were played and Ali Abu Bakr supposedly deceived the Egyptians that on the sign of a drumbeat, the Oromo were supposed to attack them in their sleep. The Egyptians thus awaited the signal and killed the emir as soon as the drums sounded.

== See also ==
- List of emirs of Harar
