= Turpentine Jake =

Play by Linda Bannister and James E. Hurd, Jr

- First edition cover
- Author: Linda Bannister and James E. Hurd, Jr.
- Cover artist: Kerri Blackstone
- Language: English
- Genre: Non-fiction
- Publisher: Marymount Institute Press and Tsehai Publishers
- Publication date: October 2011
- Publication place: United States
- Media type: Paperback
- Pages: 129 (Paperback edition)
- ISBN: 978-0-9839616-0-4 (Paperback edition)

Turpentine Jake is a play by Linda Bannister and James E. Hurd, Jr. The subject is the turpentiners, African-American men who harvested pine gum in the Florida Panhandle.

Turpentine Jake was performed Aug. 1 – 24, 2008, at the Del Rey Theatre in Los Angeles, CA. It received two NAACP Theatre Award nominations.

== Summary ==
The turpentiners worked fourteen hours a day harvesting pine gum from longleaf pine trees from 1890 to 1960. These men were held under debt peonage, earning less than the cost of food and clothing provided by the company store.

Turpentine Jake is based on the true story of Hurd's grandfather and oral histories gathered from surviving turpentine workers. The play follows Jake, a legendary storyteller and mentor to those in the camps, as he spins tales and songs that help his fellow workers assert some control over their oppressive environment.

A drama with music and original folktales, Turpentine Jake has a total of twenty-one roles.

Turpentine Jake's premiere was staged in a workshop at Loyola Marymount University's Del Rey Theatre.

== Reviews ==
“While the historical setting of Turpentine Jake takes place more than fifty years ago, debt peonage is as much an issue in the present as it was in the past. Turpentine Jake is a play for our time,” says Elias Wondimu, publisher and editorial director, Marymount Institute Press and Tsehai Publishers.

“Turpentine Jake is a play full of mystery and song, with an epic story and indelible characters that lifts some dark times out of the piney forests of Florida and into the hearts of the audience. On the cloud of an ending that is as honest as it is surprising, I left the theater feeling thankful and hopeful about what theater can accomplish with wonderful material.” —Constance Congdon, Playwright in Residence at Amherst College

“Turpentine Jake is a breakthrough play that highlights the social milieu surrounding a forgotten chapter of American life … a 21st century warning to all of us when we consider the ongoing balancing act of business needs versus the dictates of morality and ethics.” —Valencia E. Matthews, Ph.D., Director of Theatre at Florida A&M University

“Turpentine Jake is that rare synthesis of history and theatre that stuns us with its authenticity, and shakes us with its dramatic charge. Through sweat, music, laughter, and pain it draws us into a deep examination of race and our national character. This play will live in your heart for a long time after you have experienced it.” —Kevin Lawler, Producing Artistic Director of The Great Plains Theatre Conference, Omaha

“Turpentine Jake is a compelling account, written in a richly textured language, that distills an historic disgrace into compelling action, spiced with humor and American magic realism.” —Ron West, Ph.D., Prof. Theatre, Metropolitan Community College, Omaha, Nebraska
