= Abu Bakr II ibn ʽAbd al-Munan =

Abu Bakr ibn Abd al-Munan أمير أبو بكر إبن عبد أل منون
- 15th Emir of Harar
- Reign: 1829 - 1852
- Predecessor: ʽAbd al-Karim ibn Muhammad
- Successor: Ahmad III ibn Abu Bakr
- Born: 1800s Harar-Gey
- Died: 1852; Harar-Gey
- Dynasty: Ali ibn Dawud Dynasty
- Religion: Sunni Islam

Abu Bakr II ibn ʽAbd al-Munan was the emir of Harar (1829–1852). He was the son of ʽAbd al-Mannan Garad of Zeila, the nephew of ʽAbd ar-Rahman ibn Muhammad, and the husband of Gisti (Harari: "princess") Fatima, ʽAbd ar-Rahman's oldest daughter. He succeeded to the throne of Harar upon the death of ʽAbd ar-Rahman.

== Biography ==
He is recognized for initiating a trade agreement with the Shewan ruler Sahle Selassie, which granted Harari merchants access to the Abyssinian town of Aliyu Amba.

For a number of years in the 1830s, Abu Bakr campaigned against the neighboring Oromo with an armed force which the British explorer W. C. Barker described as "consisting of from 150 to 200 matchlock men, 100 cavalry armed with long spears, 60 spearmen on foot, and a few archers. Insignificant, however, as this force really is, the matchlockmen alone render it far superior to that of the neighbouring tribes, who have a great dread of fire-arms; they have not even a single matchlock in their possession." Despite his military successes, by 1840 Harari merchants lamented that the neighboring Oromo were devastating the neighboring villages. The Harari were attacked in their fields within sight of the city walls in the middle of the day, and the city was spared in the end only by paying tribute.

In 1849 British lieutenant describes the Emir's palace and guards:

"The Emir's house is perpetually surrounded with guards, and no one dares to pass the gate of the court-yard mounted, or at a walk-he must cover his face and run. The Emir's guard is composed of perhaps sixty matchlock-men, and he has also a body of a native spearmen in his pay."

Richard Burton alludes to the existence of communications between Emir Abu Bakr and the British governor of Aden. At the same time, there was tension between Harar and Hajj Sharmakay, ruler of Zeila; in response to the Emir's imprisonment of his agent in Harar, Hajj Sharmakay persuaded Haile Melekot, son of the ruler of Shewa, to imprison about 300 citizens of Harar then resident in Shewa.

Burton also mentions that Abu Bakr's vizier, or chief minister, was the treacherous Garad Mohammed, who also served his son Ahmad. Burton had been told that, before his death, Abu Bakr had warned his son about the man.

He died on 8 July 1852 and was succeeded by his son Ahmad, who initially ruled under the regency of his mother Gisti Fatima, who was popular with the people of Harar.

== See also ==
- List of emirs of Harar
- Emirate of Harar
- Sharmarke Ali Saleh
