= Harriet Tubman Press =

American publishing house

- Founded: August 15, 2016
- Founder: Elias Wondimu
- Headquarters location: Loyola Marymount University
- Key people: Shonda Buchanan - literary editor; Brad Elliot Stone, Ph.D. - academic editor
- Imprints: imprint of TSEHAI Publishers
- Official website: www.harriettubmanpress.com

Harriet Tubman Press (HTP) is an imprint of TSEHAI Publishers established in August 2016 while housed at Loyola Marymount University (LMU) in Los Angeles. The press was created to be a "new source for African-American literature and academic works". HTP publishes works which represent African-American voices in the United States and throughout the globe, focusing on "uncovering hidden narratives". The press emphasizes publishing African-American literature and scholarship.

== History and mission ==
The Harriet Tubman Press was established in the Marymount Institute for Faith, Culture, and the Arts at Loyola Marymount University to publish academic work and literature as well as stories from African-American communities. The press is "a forum for hidden narratives to be uncovered and for academic and creative works to be published on underrepresented and misrepresented communities".

Elias Wondimu, editor and founder of HTP's family publishing house TSEHAI Publishers, of which HTP is an imprint, said Harriet Tubman was the chosen namesake "because she is an example for those fighting for an equal and just society" and added that HTP is a publishing house for "both established and up-and-coming literary writers and scholars".

== Publications ==
- Voices from Leimert Park: Redux: A Los Angeles Poetry Anthology, edited by Shonda Buchanan
- One Sunday in Mississippi: A One Act Play, by Linda Bannister and James E. Hurd, Jr.
