= Ganz province =

Former province conquered in the 19th century in the Ethiopian region

Ganz (Amharic: ገንዝ Gänz), also known as Ganazo or Ganzo, was a province surrounding what is now the capital region and city of Addis Ababa in Ethiopia.

== Islamic state ==
Originally an Islamic state ruled by a Garad and later a Hegano, Ganz was part of the unsuccessful Islamic alliance that opposed Amda Seyon I in the 1320s. The polity allied with the Sultanate of Adal again in Ahmedudin Badlay's war to retake Dawaro from Abyssinian control, but Ganz was defeated and became an Abyssinian province.

Imam Ahmed Gurey's forces recaptured Ganz during his jihad, but the territory returned to Abyssinian control soon after his death.

== End of Ganz ==
Ganz was occupied in the Oromo migrations by the Tulama Oromo, though the territory was conquered in the 19th century by the Kingdom of Shewa, who made Addis Ababa their capital. Shewa went on to unify the country into Ethiopia.
