= Muhammad Nadi Pasha =

Sudanese politician (1836-?)

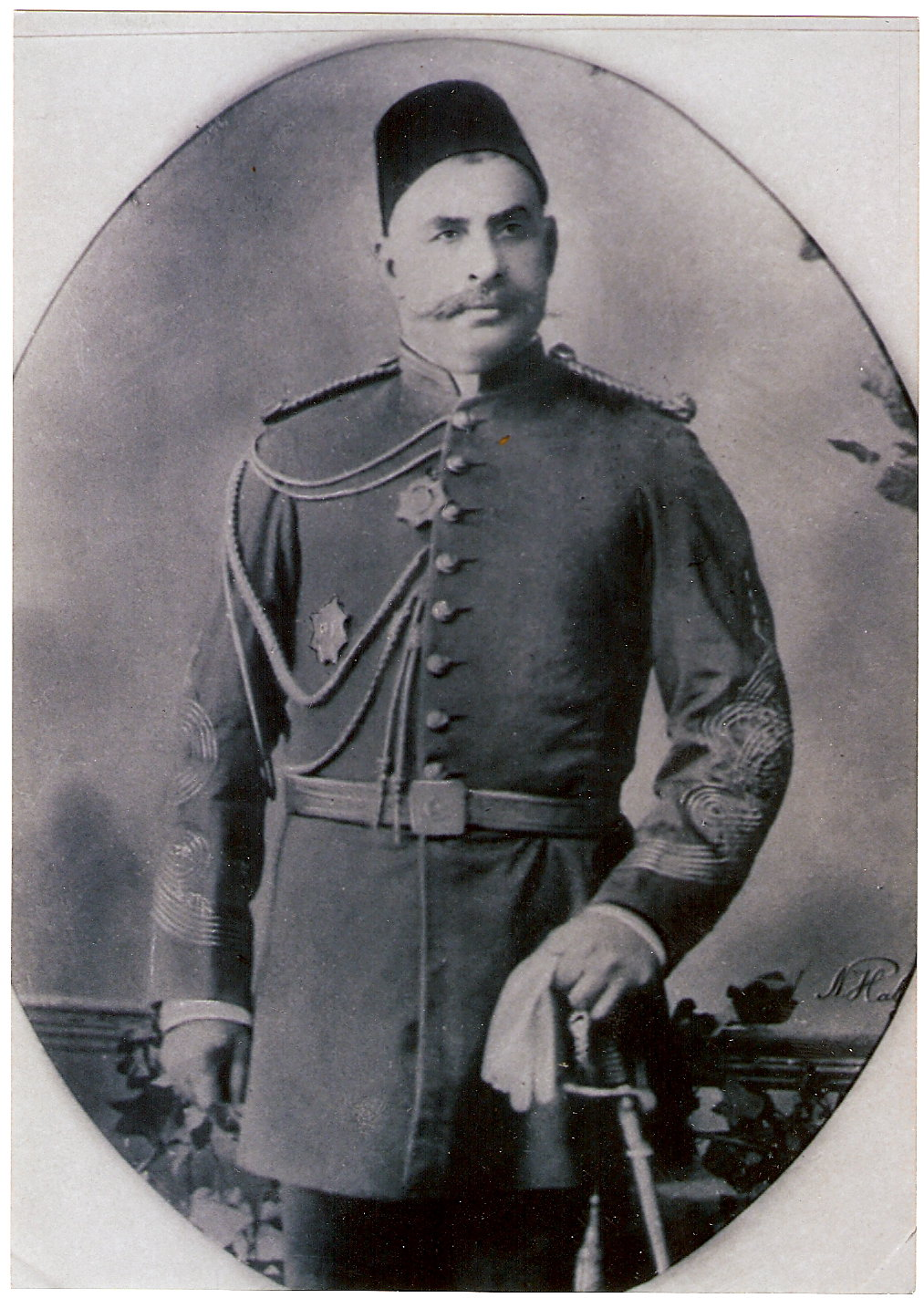
Nadi Pasha in 1883

Muhammad Nadi Pasha (born c. 1836 – death date unknown) was an Egyptian General. He served as Deputy Governor of Sudan, was then promoted to the rank of Mirmiran and served as Governor General of Harar and its independents, the area which now includes Somalia, Djibouti, Eritrea and eastern Ethiopia. Nadi Pasha also served as acting Governor General of Sudan in 1882.

== As governor of Harar ==
In Harar, Nadi Pasha forced the troops to observe a strict discipline and organized the city police. He also had walls constructed around Harar.

Nadi Pasha always regarded trade, especially trade with the Europeans, as essential to the prosperity of Harar. He encouraged Europeans to undertake the business of the city, though he insisted that the main wealth of the country was in agriculture.

Nadi Pasha allowed the Catholic Mission to freely practice her religion in Harar and even allowed the ringing of bells, displaying remarkable religious tolerance, considering the historical period.

== Later career ==
Nadi Pasha also played a major role in ending the slave trade in the Horn of Africa.

At the end of his career in 1897, Nadi Pasha was appointed Prince of Pilgrimage (Hajj).
