= Malak (title) =

Chief

Malak (Harari: መላቅ) (sometimes spelled Malaq) was an administrative designation in the Horn of Africa.

== Etymology ==
Linguist Wolf Leslau said that the term Malaq signifies chief for one of the five gates of Harar. It is derived from two Harari words, "mala" and "aqa," which together mean 'who knows the way and means.' Historian Manfred Kropp said that it may be associated with another Harari title, Malassay.

Malak also means ‘chief’ in Somali (a term borrowed from Harari according to linguist Giorgio Banti and historian Enrico Cerulli) and in both the Afar and Oromo languages.

== History ==
Historians Avishai Ben-Dror and Mohammed Hassen both said that the term "Malak" has its roots in the fifteenth century within the context of the Adal Sultanate. In the 1600s, the leader of the Imamate of Aussa was referred to as Malaq Adam b. Sadiq.

This designation persisted in the successor states of Adal, including the Aussa Sultanate and the Emirate of Harar.

== Notable Malak ==
- ʽAli ibn Daʽud

== See also ==
- Hegano
- Garad
- Ughaz
- Kabir (teacher)
