= Asmadin Bari =

Historical gate in Ethiopia

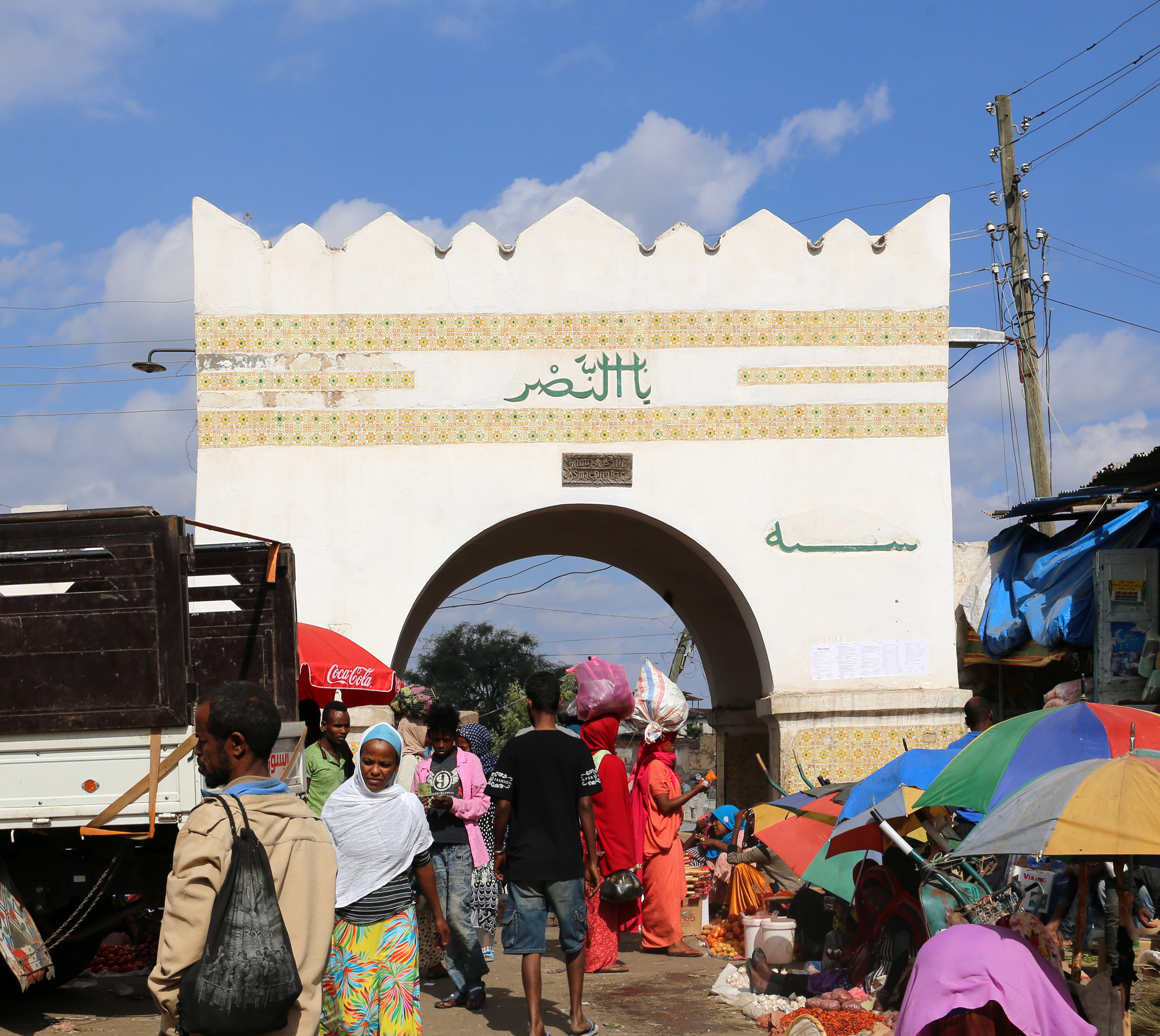
Asmadin Bari

Asmadin Bari, meaning "Asmadin Gate" is one of five ancient gates of Harar, Ethiopia. It was named after the sixteenth century Garad (general) named Asmadin. According to tradition the founder of Harar Abadir and his companions inhabited this district of the town near the gate. In 1662 this gate was attacked by the Oromo invaders which led to the death of Sabr Ad-adin, the son of ʽAli ibn Daʽud, founder of the new Emirate of Harar dynasty.
