= Battle of Chelenqo =

1887 battle between the Ethiopian Empire and Emirate of Harar

- Part of Menelik's Expansions
- An Abyssinian painting of the Battle of Chelenqo in the 1900s
| Date | 9 January 1887 |
| Location | Chelenqo, Chercher, Emirate of Harar |
| Result | Shewan victory: Capture of the city of Harar; Collapse of the Emirate of Harar and absorption into the Ethiopian Empire |

Belligerents
| (Ethiopian Empire) Shewa | Emirate of Harar |

Commanders and leaders
| Negus Menelik; Ras Makonnen | 'Abd Allah II ibn 'Ali 'Abd ash-Shakur |

Strength
| 20,000–25,000 Shewan troops | 3,000–4,000 Harari troops |

Casualties and losses
| 800 dead & wounded | Substantial, est. 1,000 dead |

The Battle of Chelenqo was an engagement fought on 9 January 1887 between the Abyssinian army of Shewa under Negus Menelik and Emir 'Abd Allah II ibn 'Ali 'Abd ash-Shakur of Harar. The Harari forces were routed, and Negus Menelik afterwards occupied and annexed the city of Harar.

== Background ==
Negus Menelik, in response to Italian control of parts of Mereb Melash and the port of Massawa, had begun to import firearms and munitions through the French-controlled ports of Djibouti. By 1886, Emir 'Abd Allah of Harar had blocked transport of these arms through his territories.

The massacre of the Italian explorer Count Pietro Porro and his entire party in April 1886, allegedly at the Emir's command, gave the Negus an excuse to march on Harar. Menelik had desired control of the city of Harar for some time. Menelik's general suffered a defeat at the hands of the Emirate of Harar's forces in late 1886 at the Battle of Hirna. Menelik would however make a second attempt to invade the Emirate of Harar in January 1887 offering 'Abd Allah the same kind of autonomy that Abba Jifar II of the Kingdom of Jimma enjoyed; the Emir refused this offer.

According to Abdullahi Mohammed, the Emir of Harar assembled an army from various districts within the town:

"In the war fought between Amir Abdullahi Muhammed (1885-87) and Emperor Menilik II, the army of the former seems to have been recruited from the city's four quarters: Assum Beri, Asma'din Bari, Badro Bari and Suqutat Bari."

== Battle ==
According to historian El Amin Abdel Karim Ahmed:

"The Harari Chronicle maintains that Menilek and 'Abdullāhi became involved in an exchange of arrogant challenges just before the battle commenced. Menilek boasted about the numerical superiority of his forces while 'Abdullāhi reminded him of the forcefulness of is own men."

Knowing that he was heavily outnumbered, and his troops had only obsolete matchlocks and a few cannons, Emir 'Abd Allah decided to attack on early in the morning of Ethiopian Christmas (January 9), expecting the Shewans to be unprepared and befuddled with food and alcohol. However, Negus Menelik was worried about a surprise attack, and kept his men at alert.

The Amir misjudged the quality of these troops and attempted to repeat his earlier success with a second night attack. "Had he allowed the enemy to attack the walled city, where his few Krupp cannon might have been effective, the Shewans might have suffered a defeat with serious political consequences," Marcus notes. The Emir's men opened fire at 11:00 am. The Shewan soldiers quickly responded and Makonnen's column destroyed the enemy artillery; within twenty minutes, Menelik's troops were victorious. Menelik pursued the retreating emir to Harar, whose ancient walls would not long resist his assault. Once Menelik reached Harar, the Amir fled with his wives and children into the desert country east of Harar leaving his uncle Ali Abu Bakar to negotiate the city's surrender. With the occupation, the independence of Harar came to an end.

== Aftermath ==
According to Jules Borelli, Harar was pillaged by Abyssinian soldiers with half its population fleeing, despite pleas from the despoiled locals to Makonnen. As the occupation progressed, Makonnen set about undermining Harari wealth by expropriating their land and offering it to his soldiers.

The most ardent supporters of Emir 'Abd Allah II ibn 'Ali 'Abd ash-Shakur in the trade route, particularly the Issa-Somali factions, were eliminated, and the route linking Harar and Zeila was described as open and secure, enabling caravans to travel freely and without risk. Conversely, the route linking Harar and Berbera, which had previously served as a significant trade route, was noted to have been mostly deserted by this time.

Following the Battle of Chelenqo in 1887, the governance of Hararge and the adjacent Harar region was assigned to Dejazmach Makonnen Wolde Mikael, who subsequently received a promotion to Ras. A significant number of highland Christians relocated to Harar, establishing themselves as the new ruling elite. The Harari nobility was granted limited involvement in the administration of the city, as the management was delegated to the Amir's nephew, Ali. Nevertheless, the violence and further atrocities inflicted upon the local population by the Abyssinians persisted, prompting the Harari people to revolt. In response, Makonnen advanced into the city with his forces, subdued the populace, and detained Ali. Upon entering the town, the troops went on a rampage, destroying and plundering homes, oppressing the residents, and massacring civilians. Historian Norman Bennett suggests that Makonnen may have instigated an uprising to secure absolute authority in Harar.

As stated by British historian Richard Pankhurst, the Harari were essentially deprived of any real power, reduced to mere token representation in a few public offices. The Abyssinian authorities closely monitored the hills encircling the city, leading to the destruction of the central mosque and the subsequent construction of the Medhane Alem Church in its stead.

== See also ==
- Battle of Embabo
- Harar
- Harari People
- Ittu Oromo
