= Bahru Zewde =

Ethiopian historian and author (born 1947)

- Born: 1947 (age 78–79); Addis Ababa, Ethiopian Empire
- Education: Haile Selassie I University (BA); SOAS University of London (PhD)
- Occupations: Historian; author

Bahru Zewde (Amharic: ባሕሩ ዘውዴ, born 1947 in Addis Ababa) is an Ethiopian historian and author. He writes extensively about modern Ethiopian history (1855 to the present) and is now an emeritus professor at Addis Ababa University where he once served as the Head of the History Department and the Director of the Institute of Ethiopian Studies.

== Early life and education ==
He earned his Bachelor of Arts degree in history with distinction from Haile Selassie I University (present-day Addis Ababa University) in 1970 and his PhD in African history from the School of Oriental and African Studies at the University of London in 1976.

== Career ==
In addition to his professorship at Addis Ababa University, Zewde was a visiting professor at the University of Illinois Urbana-Champaign in 1992 and at the University of Hamburg in 2002. He has also held fellowships at the British Academy, the University of Oxford, and the Japan Foundation.

== Selected publications ==
- Zewde, Bahru (1991). A History of Modern Ethiopia 1855–1991. Suffolk: James Currey.
- — (2001). A History of Modern Ethiopia 1855–1991 (2nd ed.). Addis Ababa: Addis Ababa University Press.
- — (2002). Pioneers of Change in Ethiopia: The Reformist Intellectuals of the Early Twentieth Century. Athens: Ohio University Press.
- —, ed. (2002). 'Between the Jaws of Hyenas': A Diplomatic History of Ethiopia 1876–1896. Wiesbaden: Harrassowitz Verlag.
- —, ed. (2005). Land, Gender and the Periphery: Themes in the History of Eastern and Southern Africa. Addis Ababa: Organisation for Social Science Research in Eastern and Southern Africa.
- —, ed. (2008). Society, State and Identity in African History. Addis Ababa: Forum for Social Science.
- — (2010). Documenting the Ethiopian Student Movement: An Exercise in Oral History (PDF). Addis Ababa: Forum for Social Studies.
- — (2012). Society & State in Ethiopian History. Los Angeles: TSEHAI Publishers.
- — (2014). The Quest for Socialist Utopia: The Ethiopian Student Movement, c. 1960–1974. Suffolk: James Currey.
