= ʽAbd al-Shakur ibn Yusuf =

Abd Al Shakur ibn Yusuf أمير عبد الشكور بن يوسف
- 11th Emir of Harar
- Reign: 1783 - 1794
- Predecessor: Mahamed ibn Yusuf
- Successor: `Abd al-Karim ibn Muhammad
- Born: 1750s Harar-Gey
- Died: 1794; Harar-Gey
- Dynasty: Ali ibn Dawud Dynasty
- Religion: Sunni Islam

Abd al-Shakur ibn Yusuf was Emir of Harar (1783–1794). He was the first Emir of Harar to give the neighboring Oromo gifts. He went to them in the first years of his reign, and brought with him bales of sheetings which he gave to the Alla and Nole Oromo. He may have done this to free the way for salt and other goods which had to be brought through their territories.

Another example of his efforts to "civilize" the Oromo was his construction of a shrine to the Baghdadi saint `Abd al-Qadir al-Jilani near the tomb of Sheikh Hussein, which lies to the south deep in the territory of the Oromo people. His territory also extended into modern day Shewa mainly Aliyu Amba and Sar Amba.

Emir Abd al-Shakur's attempts to reform the administrative system of Harar, by reintroducing the institutions of sijill and diwan, is attested in a document dated to AD 1785/6.

== See also ==
- List of emirs of Harar
- Harar
- Abd al-Qadir al-Jilani
- Sheikh Hussein
