= ʽAbd ar-Rahman ibn Muhammad =

Abu ar-Rahman ibn Muhammad أمير عبد الرحمن بن محمد
- 13th Emir of Harar
- Reign: 1821 - 1825
- Predecessor: Ahmad ibn Muhammad
- Successor: ʽAbd al-Karim ibn Muhammad
- Born: 1790s Harar-Gey
- Died: 1840s Harar-Gey
- Dynasty: Ali ibn Dawud Dynasty
- Religion: Sunni Islam

ʽAbd ar-Rahman ibn Muhammad (died 16 June 1825) was the Emir of Harar (1821 - 1825).

On the death of his brother, Emir Ahmad II ibn Muhammad, ʽAbd ar-Rahman and his other brother ʽAbd al-Karim quarreled over who would succeed, and ʽAbd ar-Rahman gained the throne first with the help of the Babille Oromo who dwelled to the east of Harar. However, while returning from an unsuccessful campaign to extract tribute from the Ala Oromo in 1825, he was betrayed to these people and imprisoned in Fedis which led to ʽAbd al-Karim seizing the throne. Abd al-Rahman appealed for help from his Babille allies, who helped him resist his deposition. In the end, ʽAbd ar-Rahman was deposed and forty villages are listed as having been destroyed by the Oromo to the north, west and south of Harar, as well as in Babille country during this civil war.

According to Richard F. Burton, ʽAbd al-Karim had recruited 60 or 70 Arab matchlockmen, under one Haydar Assal the Auliki, to fight against the Oromo. The mercenaries ran out of ammunition, and losing twenty of their number retired to Harar. The Oromo captured Abd al-Karim and Abd Ar-Rahman, seized the throne and with the aid of the inhabitants started to murder the Arab mercenaries. The mercenaries, however, defended themselves and would have restored Abd al-Rahman as Emir, had Abd ar-Rahman not declined their offer; the Arab mercenaries then drew their pay and marched off to Zeila. R.A. Caulk explains that this was a garbled version of the fraternal battle for the throne.

One source states that he had one daughter, Gisti Fatima, who married his eventual successor Abu Bakr II ibn ʽAbd al-Munan.

== See also ==
- List of emirs of Harar
- Harar
