= Battle of Fatagar =

Battle of Fatagar may refer to:

- Battle of Fatagar (1516), a battle in which Ethiopian forces under Emperor Lebna Dengel killed Mahfuz, the Adal governor of Zeila
- Battle of Fatagar (1559), a battle in which Adal forces under Nur ibn Mujahid killed Emperor Gelawdewos
