= Ahmad I ibn Abi Bakr =

Ahmad I ibn Abi Bakr أمير أبو الرحمن بن محمد
- 9th Emir of Harar
- Reign: 1755 - 1782
- Predecessor: Yusuf ibn Abi Bakr
- Successor: Mahamed ibn Yusuf
- Born: 1710s Harar-Gey
- Died: 1782; Harar-Gey
- Dynasty: Ali ibn Dawud Dynasty
- Religion: Sunni Islam

Ahmad I ibn Abi Bakr was Emir of Harar from 1755 to 1782. He made several successful military expeditions against the Oromo around the city of Harar, which probably helped to keep the trade routes open west to Shewa and east to Zeila.

== See also ==
- List of emirs of Harar
- Harar
