= Aliyu Amba =

Town in Amhara Region, Ethiopia

- Town
- Location in Ethiopia
- Coordinates: 09°32′N 39°48′E
- Country: Ethiopia
- Region: Amhara
- Zone: Semien Shewa
- Elevation: 1,805 m (5,922 ft)

Population (2005 est.)
  - Total: 2,873
- Time zone: UTC+3 (EAT)

Aliyu Amba (Amharic: ዐልዩ ዐምባ) is a town in central Ethiopia. Located in the Semien Shewa Zone of the Amhara Region, this town has a latitude and longitude of 09°32′N 39°48′E with an elevation of 1805 meters above sea level. It was historically part of the Ifat region. The town is located near the ancient state of Kwelgora.

Charles Johnston, who passed through this settlement 31 May 1841, described it as "perched upon a flat-topped isolated rock that, nearly at right angles with the road, juts across the upper end of a pretty little valley".

There is a weekly market in Aliyu Amba, which is held on Sunday. Educational facilities in the early 1990s included one primary and one junior secondary school.

== Foundation ==
As per the accounts of local Argobba inhabitants, the town was established during the rule of Ahmed ibn Ibrahim al-Ghazi, the leader of the Adal Sultanate in the sixteenth century. Aleyyu, a close associate of Ahmed, initiated a marketplace in the area, which functioned as a commercial hub for Adal.

== History ==
The town Aliyu Amba known commonly as Little Harar of Shewa re-emerged as one of the largest marketplaces in the region during the prominence of the kingdom of Shewa in the seventeenth century. It was also briefly under the occupation of the Emirate of Harar, led by Emir ʽAbd al-Shakur ibn Yusuf in the late 1700s. Aliyu Amba owed its importance to its location on the caravan route that stretched from Saqqa in the Gibe region at its western point to Harar in the east and Tadjoura on the Red Sea. It was the most important market of central Ethiopia in the early and middle 19th century, and its merchants were almost entirely Muslim. The rulers of Shewa in Abyssinia and the Emirate of Harar co-operated in keeping this west-east route open. As a result the two potentates were in regular contact, and the head of the Harari community in Aliyu Amba was appointed by the Emir of Harar. This town was also an important center of the amoleh trade in the 1830s, and Mordechai Abir notes that a 10 per cent duty on all sales rendered to the Shewan government 3,000 Maria Theresa Thalers in cash and the equivalent of 2,000 in kind. In the 1840s a Harari leader of a delegate from Harar, referred to as "Abdal Wanag" (lion of Adal) was governor of the town.

Aliyu Amba consisted of Islamic missionaries in the mid 1800s most notably Hajji Umar Sawlani of Argobba who was martyred in Chercher by pagan Ituu Oromo along with his entire entourage. At the height of its importance in the late 1870s, Aliyu Amba was estimated by Antonio Cecchi to have a population of about 4,000. However, when Emperor Menelik II moved his court from neighboring Ankober to Entoto (and later Addis Ababa), the town lost importance. It was not until 1990 that a road 16 kilometers in length was built to connect Aliyu Amba with Ankober by Lutheran organizations and the Mekane Yesus Church with the help of local workers. The Mekane Yesus have also started a program dedicated to reversing the land degradation of the farmland around the town.

== Demographics ==
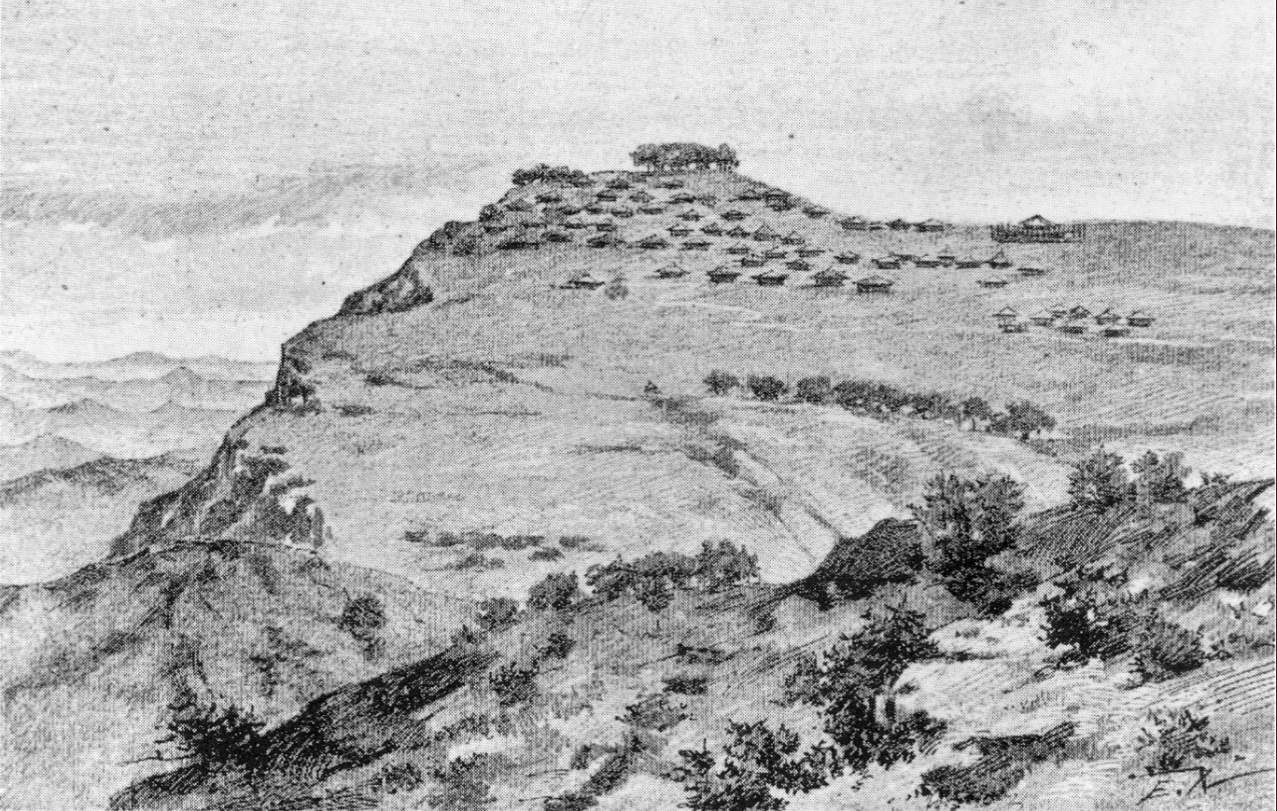
Overview of Aliyu Amba which served as the main trading town for Shewa in the nineteenth century by Gustavo Bianchi

Based on figures from the Central Statistical Agency in 2005, Aliyu Amba has an estimated total population of 2,873 of whom 1,431 are men and 1,442 are women. The inhabitants include members of the Argobba people. The 1994 census reported this town had a total population of 1,582 of whom 719 were men and 863 were women. It is one of four towns in Ankober woreda.

In the nineteenth century, the English traveler Charles Beke noted that the inhabitants included native groups such as the Afars, Argobbas, Hararis, and some Amharas, Gurages, and Somalis, in addition to foreigners like Indians, Arabs, Turks, Armenians, and Greeks.
