= Ahmad III ibn Abu Bakr =

Ahmad III ibn Abu Bakr امير احمد بن ابوبكر
- 16th Emir of Harar
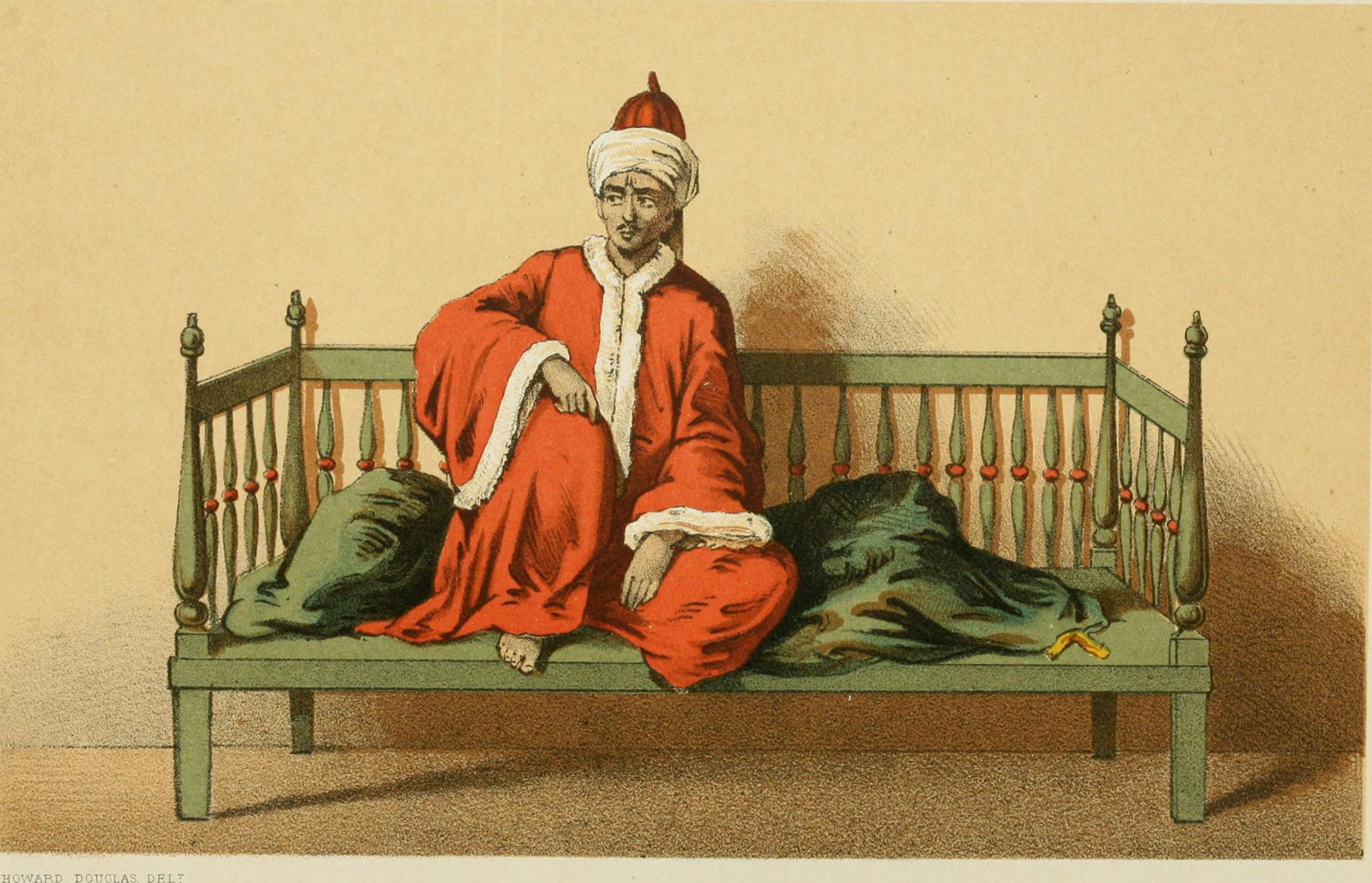
- Emir Ahmad of Harar
- Reign: 1852 - 1856
- Predecessor: Abu Bakr II ibn `Abd al-Munan
- Successor: Muhammad ibn 'Ali 'Abd ash-Shakur
- Born: 1830s Harar-Gey
- Died: 1856
- Dynasty: Ali ibn Dawud Dynasty
- Religion: Sunni Islam

Ahmad III ibn Abu Bakr was the Emir of Harar (1852–1856). He was the ruling Emir when the British explorer Richard F. Burton visited the city for ten days in January 1855, which he later described in his book, First Footsteps in East Africa.

Emir Ahmad was the son and successor of Abu Bakr II ibn `Abd al-Munan and Gisti Fatima. Burton writes that she was the daughter of a Somali chieftain, "Garad Hirsi of the Berteri tribe". Upon the death of his father Abu Bakr he succeeded to the throne of Harar, reigning firstly under the regency of his mother. His mother was still alive at the time of Burton's visit, when the Emir had taken four wives: the daughter of Gerad Hirsi, a Sayyid woman of Harar, an emancipated slave girl, and "a daughter of Gerad Abd al-Majid, one of his nobles". Burton rounds out his tally of Emir Ahmad's households with the Emir's two sons, "who will probably never ascend the throne; one is an infant, the other is a boy about five years old."

Burton described Emir Ahmad at their first meeting as "an etiolated youth twenty-four or twenty-five years old, plain and thin-bearded, with a yellow complexion, wrinkled brows and protruding eyes. His dress was a white turban tightly twisted round a tall conical cap of red velvet, like the old Turkish headgear of our painters." The Emir's health at the time was "infirm", according to Burton, who adds, "Some attribute his weakness to a fall from a horse, others declare him to have been poisoned by one of his wives. I judged him consumptive."

Burton further mentions that at the time of his visit the Emir's vizier, or chief minister, was the treacherous Garad Mohammed, a man whom Burton had been told Ahmad's father Abu Bakr had warned him about. However, Burton describes Emir Ahmad's rule as:

"(... ) severe if not just, and it has all the prestige of secrecy. As the Amharas say, the 'belly of the master is not known': even the Garad Mohammed, though summoned to council at all times, in sickness as in health, dares not offer uncalled-for advice, and the queen dowager, the Gisti Fatima, was threaten with fetters if she persisted in interference."

Concerned with matters on the coast he had good relations with the Habr Awal from Berbera who were influential in his court and was an enemy of the influential trader Haji Sharmarke Ali Saleh who controlled Zeila and would also put Berbera under his sway.

== See also ==
- List of emirs of Harar
- Harar
- Emirate of Harar
- Sharmarke Ali Saleh
- Zeyla
- Berbera
- Habr Awal
