= Merid Wolde Aregay =

- Born: 1934/1935; Adwa, Tigray province, Ethiopia
- Died: 31 December 2008 (aged 72–74)

Academic background
- Education: University College of Addis Ababa; Harvard University; University of Chicago; School of Oriental and African Studies, London
- Thesis: Southern Ethiopia and the Christian Kingdom, 1508–1708 (1971)

Academic work
- Discipline: African studies; history
- Sub-discipline: Ethiopian history; Ethiopian studies
- Institutions: Addis Ababa University

Merid Wolde Aregay (1934 or 1935–2008) was an Ethiopian historian and a scholar of Ethiopian studies.

Merid Wolde Aregay was born in Adwa in 1927 according to the Ethiopian calendar. He earned his BA in 1956 from what was called University College of Addis Ababa, now Addis Ababa University. From there, he was sent to earn an MA in education from Harvard University (1957), then a Master's in history from the University of Chicago (1959). He completed his doctorate at the School of Oriental and African Studies in London (1971).

He learned a variety of languages, both Ethiopian and foreign: "beside Amharic (Tigriñña, Geʽez, some Oromo) and several European languages beside English (Italian, French, Portuguese)". With his knowledge of Portuguese, he was the pre-eminent scholar on the history of the Portuguese Catholic influence and interaction in Ethiopian history.

His writings covered a variety of topics, regions, and periods of Ethiopian history. He is also remembered for his positive interactions with his many students, as he spent so much time in his office that it was his "second home". During the time of the Derg in Ethiopia, he helped take care of Bahru Zewde, who was imprisoned for five years.
