= ʽAbd al-Karim ibn Muhammad =

Abd al Karim ibn Muhammad أمير عبد أل كريم إبن محمد
- 14th Emir of Harar
- Reign: 1825 - 1834
- Predecessor: ʽAbd ar-Rahman ibn Muhammad
- Successor: Abu Bakr II ibn ʽAbd al-Munan
- Born: 1790s Harar-Gey
- Died: 1834; Harar-Gey
- Dynasty: Ali ibn Dawud Dynasty
- Religion: Sunni Islam

`Abd al-Karim ibn Abu Bakr was the Emir of Harar, Ethiopia (1825 - 1834). According to the British explorer Richard F. Burton, he was the brother of `Abd ar-Rahman ibn Muhammad.

On the death of his brother, Emir Ahmad II ibn Muhammad, `Abd al-Karim and his other brother `Abd ar-Rahman quarreled over who would succeed, and `Abd ar-Rahman gained the throne first with the help of the Babille Oromo who dwelled to the east of Harar. However, while returning from an unsuccessful campaign to extract tribute from the Ala Oromo in 1825, he was betrayed to these people and `Abd al-Karim made himself Emir. Abd al-Rahman appealed for help from his Babille allies, who helped him resist his deposition. In the end, `Abd ar-Rahman was deposed and forty villages are listed as having been destroyed by the Oromo to the north, west and south of Harar, as well as in Babille country during this civil war.

According to Richard F. Burton, `Abd al-Karim had recruited 60 or 70 Arab matchlockmen, under one Haydar Assal the Auliki, to wage war against the neighboring Oromo who were threatening Harar. However, the battle went against the Harari and the Arab mercenaries, the latter suffering twenty casualties before retreating within the walls of the city. The Oromo managed to enter Harar, captured both `Abd al-Karim and `Abd ar-Rahman, and aided by the inhabitants of the city attempted to slaughter the remaining Arab mercenaries. "These, however," writes Burton, "defended themselves gallantly, and would have crowned the son of Abd al-Rahman, had he not in fear declined the dignity; they then drew their pay, and marched with all the honours of war to Zeila." R.A. Caulk explains that this was a garbled version of the fraternal battle for the throne.

According to Harari tradition, the reign of `Abd al-Karim was a golden age. "Abd al-Karim is popularly depicted as a wise and just ruler and a militant proselytizer of the Oromo," writes Caulk. "He made himself so respected outside the walls, it is claimed, that the Qottu regularly paid their taxes and even the leaders of the independent Oromo gave ready redress for all injuries done to the townspeople."

According to Caulk, having no son he married his eldest daughter Fatima to the son of his brother Abd al-Mannan (who was his prisoner), Abu Bakr, whom he also made his heir and successor.

== See also ==
- List of emirs of Harar
- Harar
