= TSEHAI Publishers =

Independent, academic press based at Loyola Marymount University

- Founded: 1997 in Hollywood, California
- Founder: Elias Wondimu
- Headquarters location: Loyola Marymount University
- Imprints: Below
- Official website: www.tsehaipublishers.com

TSEHAI Publishers is an independent, academic press based at Loyola Marymount University in Los Angeles, California, U.S. It has various imprints, and is run by its founder, exiled Ethiopian journalist and publisher Elias Wondimu.

== History ==
Wondimu founded TSEHAI Publishers in 1997. Their first book was published in 1998 and from then to 2001, he ran the company while also working full-time, as managing editor of the Ethiopian Review and for UCLA-based Chicano journal Aztlán. In 2001, Elias left Aztlán to run TSEHAI full-time. Since then, TSEHAI has published over one hundred books, started academic journals available on JSTOR, and founded five imprints.

In 2002, TSEHAI launched its first imprint, the African Academic Press, to fill the void left when Heinemann ceased publishing its famous African Writers Series.

In 2007, TSEHAI moved its headquarters to Marymount Institute, at Loyola Marymount University in Los Angeles, California. Together, Wondimu and Marymount Institute Director Dr. Theresia de Vroom founded Marymount Institute Press, an imprint dedicated to upholding the tenets of the Marian tradition, and has a particular commitment to issues that concern women and spirituality of all traditions.

In August 2013, TSEHAI Publishers launched a new venture, Tsehai Films, a production company through which it plans to release documentary films exploring subjects such as media bias and perceptions of Africa. Tsehai Films released two short films on Vimeo in 2013, one exploring photographer Robert Radin's philosophies on art and life, the other looking at the way in which English scholars Richard and Rita]Pankhurst made Ethiopia their home.

In 2015, TSEHAI launched its third and fourth imprints, Chereka Books, which focuses on publishing literature for children, and Fanos Books which is for self-sponsored books. In 2016, the Harriet Tubman Press was created.

== Imprints ==
TSEHAI Publishers has five imprints which each publishes books on distinct perspectives of the human experience and cater to specific audiences. The African Academic Press, Marymount Institute Press, Harriet Tubman Press, and Chereka Books are their four most predominant imprints.

=== African Academic Press ===
In 2002, Heinemann, the leading publisher of African literature, ceased to publish its famous African Writers Series. In a time when the publishing industry was consolidating, TSEHAI stepped up to fill this void in a small way. In the past several years, TSEHAI and the AAP have published Nobel Laureate Wole Soyinka, Paul Zeleza, Bahru Zewde, Richard Pankhurst, as well as many leading scholars. The IJES and EJRS are published under the AAP imprint.

=== Marymount Institute Press ===
In 2001, TSEHAI founder Elias Wondimu left the UCLA-based journal of Chicano studies Aztlán to run TSEHAI full-time. A few years later, in 2007, TSEHAI relocated to Loyola Marymount University. In his work with the Marymount Institute, Elias and the Marymount Institute's Director Professor Theresia de Vroom co-founded Loyola Marymount's first academic press, an imprint of TSEHAI. The press has published a number of books, collections, and plays.

=== Harriet Tubman Press ===
Harriet Tubman Press is the newest imprint for TSEHAI.

=== Chereka Books ===
This imprint of TSEHAI focuses on publishing literature for children.

== Academic Journals ==
=== International Journal of Ethiopian Studies ===
TSEHAI Publishers’ International Journal of Ethiopian Studies (IJES) is a bi-annual publication containing scholarship on Ethiopian history, culture, politics, and more. The journal contains new scholarship in English and Amharic, as well as newly translated pieces, poetry, important government documents, and other relevant pieces. IJES was the first academic journal to be started by an Ethiopian institution outside of Ethiopia.

=== Ethiopian Journal of Religious Studies ===
An imprint of TSEHAI Publishers, the African Academic Press publishes the Ethiopian Journal of Religious Studies (EJRS) yearly, with 2017 being its inaugural issue. Launched in 2013, the EJRS is committed to multidisciplinary scholarly studies of Ethiopian religious practices, beliefs and institutions, their relations with each other, their roles in Ethiopian history past and present, their interactions with their milieu, their contributions to Ethiopia's cultural life and creativity, and their part in the development of Ethiopia.

== Publications ==
TSEHAI Publishers releases new books and re-publishes rare, out-of-print, and hard-to-find volumes of some significance. The press publishes a few new volumes each year, ranging in nature from biographies to history, political volumes, and memoirs. Additionally, TSEHAI publishes books in categories such as arts & photography, literature & fiction, public health, poetry, religion & spirituality, and travel. The press and its subsequent imprints continue to publish new books that appear on its website when available. The press has also republished numerous out-of-print or hard-to-find books of some importance to Ethiopian or African studies, including Richard Pankhurst's canonical Economic History of Ethiopia (1800 – 1935) and Donald N. Levine's Wax & Gold: Tradition and Innovation in Ethiopian Culture.
