= ʽAli ibn Daʽud =

`Ali ibn Da`ud أمير علي بن داود
- 1st Emir of Harar
- Reign: 1647 – 1671
- Successor: Abdallah ibn Ali
- Born: 1620s Harar-Gey
- Died: 1671; Harar-Gey
- Dynasty: Ali ibn Dawud Dynasty
- Religion: Sunni Islam

ʽAli ibn Daʽud was the first Emir of Harar and ruled from 1647–1671. He founded a new dynasty of rulers which ruled the city of Harar and its surrounding areas. Prior to becoming emir, he had held the title Malak. According to Richard Pankhurst, during his reign, the Harar's problems with the surrounding Oromos continued. In 1662 the Emir's troops met in battle of the Illamo Oromo, "which resulting in heavy casualties, doubtless on both sides," notes Pankhurst. "Those killed included the Amir's son Sabr ad-Din."

He was succeeded by his son, Abdallah I ibn Ali.

== See also ==
- List of emirs of Harar
- Emirate of Harar
- Harar
