= Emirate of Harar =

1647–1887 Muslim kingdom in the Horn of Africa

- 1647–1887
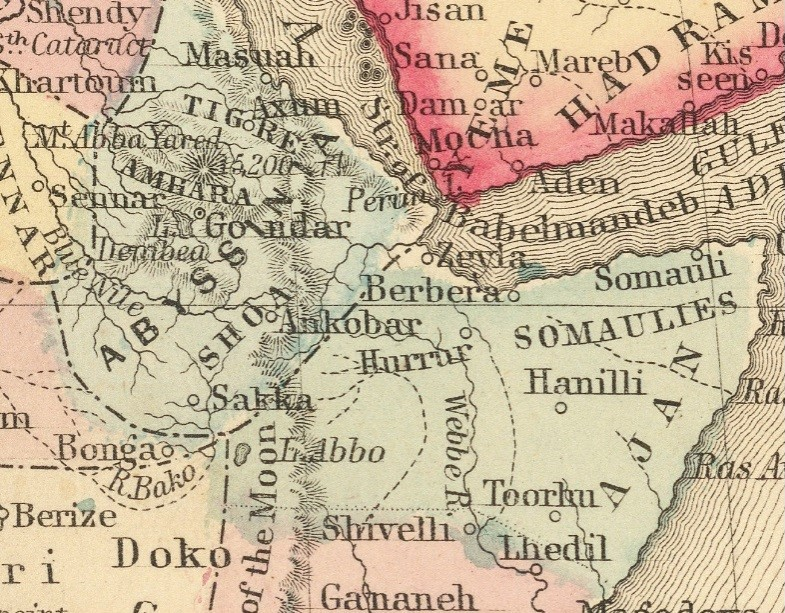
- The Emirate of Harar confined by the Somalis in the east and Abyssinia in the west c. 1860
- Status: Sovereign kingdom (1647–1875) (1884–1887); Subject of the Khedivate of Egypt (1875–1884)
- Capital: Ge
- Common languages: Arabic; Harari; Somali; Oromo; Argobba
- Religion: Sunni Islam
- Government: Absolute monarchy
- Emir
  - 1647-1671: `Ali ibn Da`ud
  - 1884-1887: `Abdullahi II
- History
  - Established: 1647
  - Disestablished: 1887
- Currency: Mahlak
Preceded by	Succeeded by
Imamate of Aussa	Ethiopian Empire
- Today part of: Ethiopia

The Emirate of Harar was a Muslim kingdom founded in 1647 when the Harari people refused to accept Imām ʿUmardīn Ādam as their ruler and broke away from the Imamate of Aussa to form their own state under `Ali ibn Da`ud.

The city of Harar Gey served as its sole capital. Prior to its invasion by Shewan forces under Menelik II, the League of Nations noted that the Harar Emirate made up the area between the rivers Awash and Shebelle while the Ogaden was a tributary state. Originally however the Harar Emirate composed of present-day Somalia and to the south of eastern Ethiopia including the Arsi Province. Numerous Oromo and Somali clans in the region paid tax to the Emirate as late as the 18th century despite their gradual annexation of lands in the Harari state. Harar also dominated trade in Shewa.

Harar's influence began shrinking in the 19th century possibly due to lack of resources and famine. Like all Muslim states in the area. The British Empire defeated the Khedivate and occupied its territories in 1882 including Harar, but the British agreed to evacuate Harar and essentially cede the city to the Ethiopian Empire's sphere of influence in exchange for assistance against Mahdist forces in Sudan. As per the terms of their agreement (the Hewett Treaty), the British withdrew from Harar in 1884, leaving the city to the son of the former Emir of Harar with a few hundred rifles, some cannon and a handful of British trained officers. The Emirate would be finally destroyed and annexed by the armies of Negus Sahle Maryam of Shewa (the future Emperor Menelik II) in 1887 following the Emirate's defeat at the Battle of Chelenqo.

== History ==
=== Formation and Preluding Strife ===
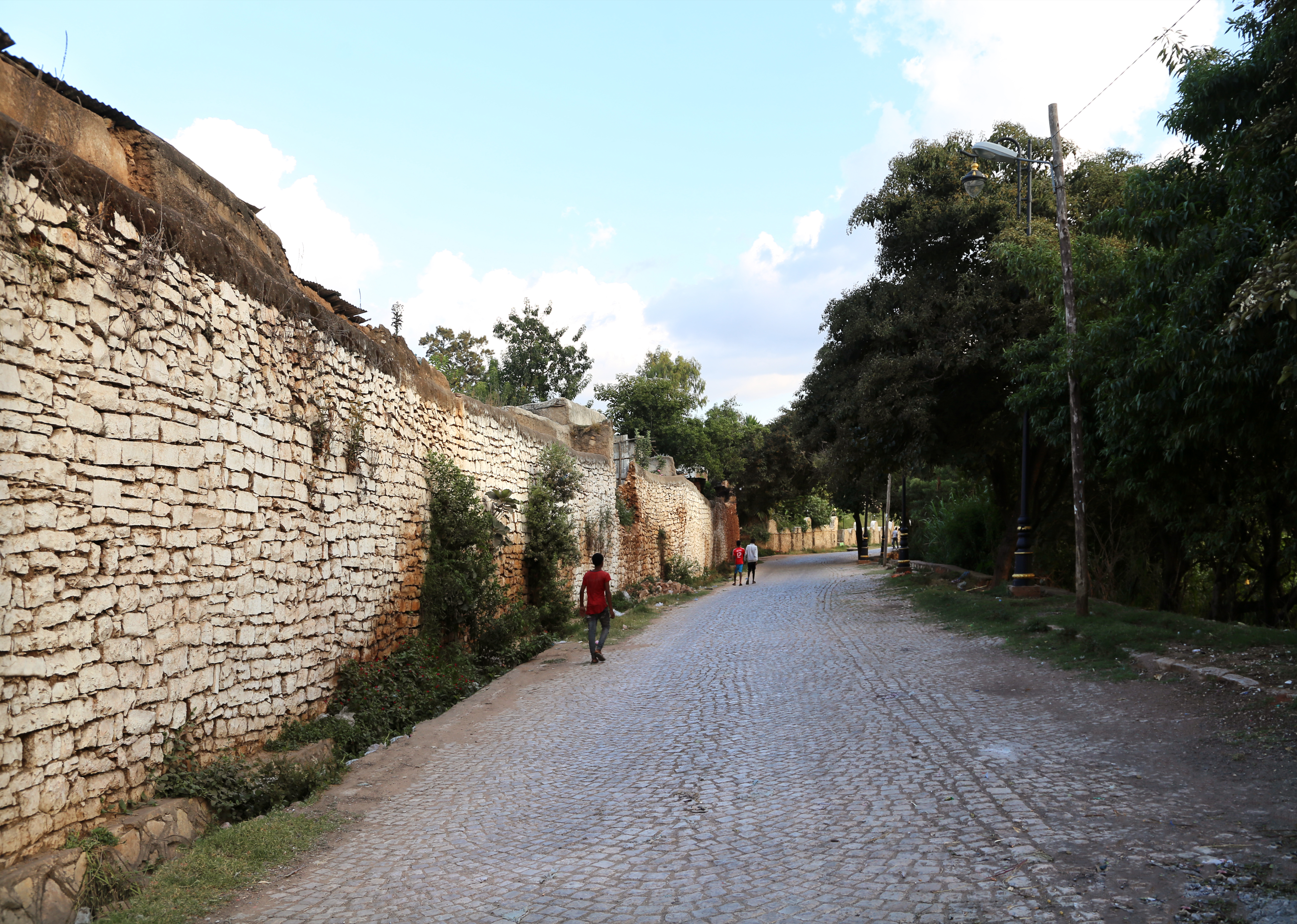
Walls of Harar city

According to historian Merid Wolde Aregay, the Harar emirate's predecessor state the Adal Sultanate, consisted mainly of Hubat, the Harari uplands, the region of Babile and extended east into the modern Somali region of Ethiopia. He adds that its inhabitants spoke Harari language and it was the most dominant polity in the region.

However Sidney Waldron and others allude to the destruction of the early Harari kingdom in the sixteenth century and its transition into a City-state:

"The Harari who remained behind the new city walls were the sole survivors of a once much wider spread ethnic and linguistic community whose full extent may never be known, but whose last trace is the record of their decimation: By 1577 (the Oromo) had destroyed more than a hundred villages and besieged the city, Until the gates were filled with corpses"

Ali ibn Da'ud came to the throne after one of many internal crises which had torn the mini-states to shreds within the vicissitudes of their entire history. A certain Emir Ahmed, the son of Wazir Abram, had reigned for 10 days when 'Ali ibn Da'ud assumed the throne of Harar, thus founding a new dynasty of the Harari emirs. Prior to this incident, Ali ibn Da'ud had risen through the ranks with previous occupations such as being a head of a district (Malak) and one of the ministers of Emir Siddiq. Having exhausted all office positions, came to be in possession of sovereign powers in the long run. On 1 September 1662 Emir Ali ibn Da'ud had to face a violent Illamo Oromo raid which, had reached as near as Asmadin Gate and killed his son Sabr ad-Din ibn al-Amir 'Ali b. Da'ud.

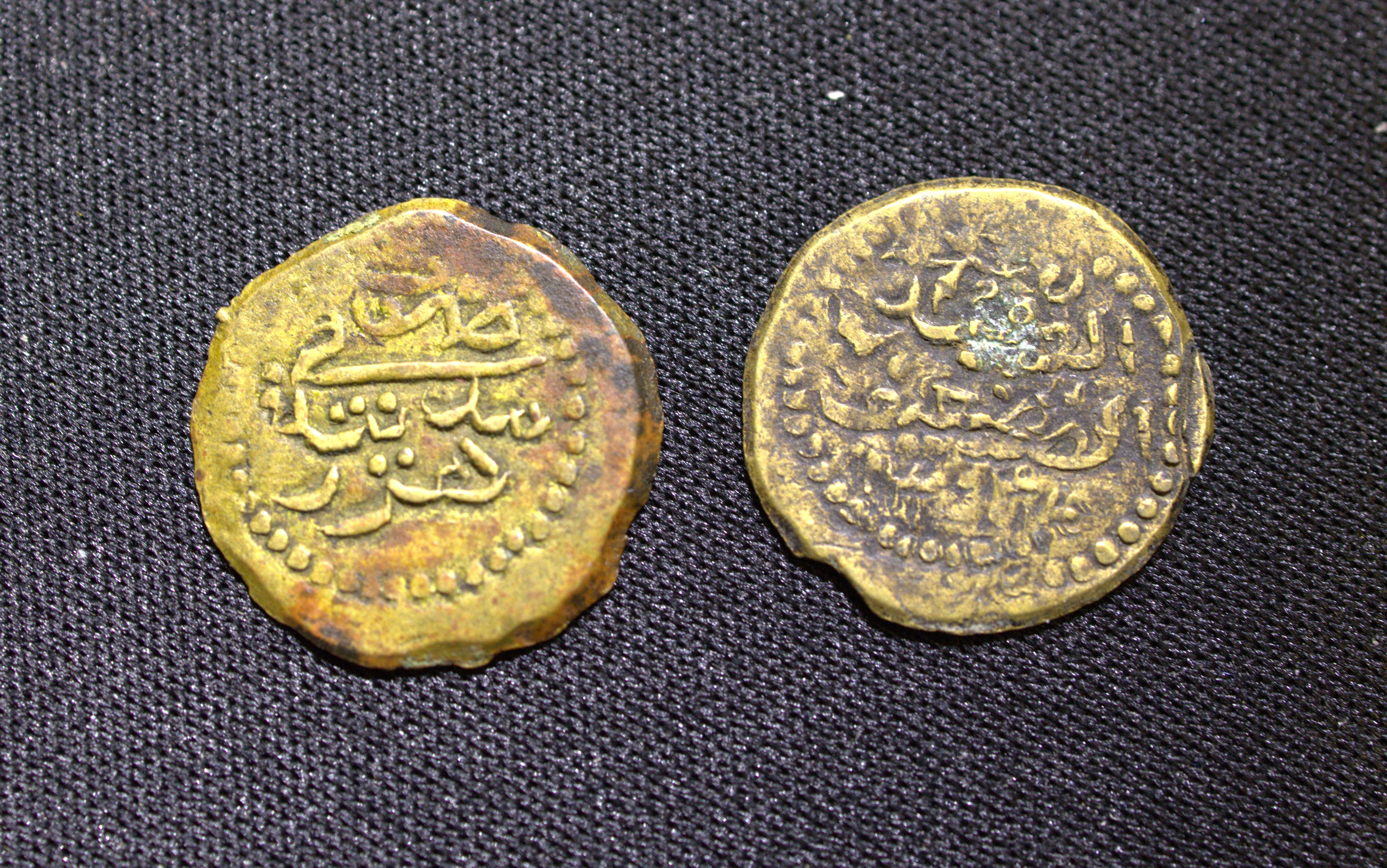
Photo of Harar Emirate coin (Mahalak)

Historian Ali Abdirahman Hersi, who specializes in Somali history, indicates that the Emirate continued to engage in trade, albeit at a reduced scale, and established settlements in the Ogaden region after the fall of the Adal Sultanate. The residents of these settlements encountered simultaneous assaults from both the Oromo and Somali, compelling them to construct a defensive wall. Emirates also occasionally exerted influence as far east as the Fafan, near the modern-day city of Jigjiga. Beginning in the seventeenth century, the Oromo people in the vicinity of Harar started to embrace Islam. During this century, the Emirate would also start the mass production of religious manuscripts, with the Harari Qurans being notable for their distinctive designs.

The houses of Harar known as Gidir Gar, constructed from stone in the 1700s, featured eleven niches on their walls that showcased a variety of items, including Chinese ceramics. According to 18th century British traveler James Bruce who visited Abyssinia, the ruler of Shewa Amha Iyasus was in conflict with the leaders of the Harar Emirate. He further stated the inhabitants of Harar were called "Turks" by the Abyssinians and led by an emir. Under the rule of Emir ʽAbd al-Shakur ibn Yusuf, the Ifat towns in modern Shewa, Aliyu Amba and Sar Amba, fell under the jurisdiction of the Emirate.

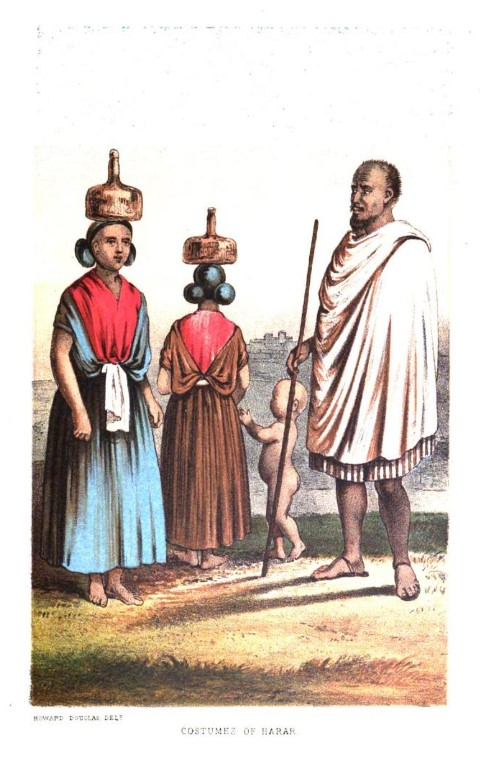
Richard Burton's illustration of the Harari people's costumes.

Nineteenth century records of the Emirate of Harar state administrators representing the emirate such as Garads and Malaks were found as far west as Dawaro. In the 1840s the Shewan state of Abyssinia under Sahle Selassie would briefly grant the Emirate authority over Aliyu Amba due to their heavy reliance on trade coming from Harar and other Muslim regions. According to information gathered from the locals about the emirate in 1843, British Capt. S.B. Hanes asserts that the leader of Harar, also known as Adhari, which designates the nation that lies within a couple days of Habash, is led by a fair-minded emir.

=== Occupation by the Egyptian Khedivate ===
In the second half of the nineteenth century, the opening of the Suez Canal drew the attention of the European states to East Africa. The Emirate of Harar found itself involved in events which later ended by terminating the independence of this old Muslim State. Above all, Egypt tried to make sure of benefits of precedence vis-à-vis European states by taking action first; and, during Khedive Ismail's reign, Werner Munzinger wrote to the Isma'il Pasha, urging him to seize Harar, the Swiss officer explained to the Egyptian ruler the economic and strategic advantages which would accrue from such a move, and that the revenue from the city's taxes would be sufficient for the upkeep of an Egyptian garrison. In 1875, Muhammad Rauf Pasha led a well armed Egyptian force of 1,200 men from Zeila into the interior of eastern Ethiopia under the guise that it was a scientific expedition to find the source of the Tekezé River and without encountering any opposition, seized Harar on 11 October 1875 and obliged Emir Muhammed 'Abd ash-Shakur to consider himself under the protection of the Khedive.

Emir Muhammed 'Abd ash-Shakur submitted Harar to the Egyptian Khedivate and had signed a treaty ceding his powers to Muhammed Ra'uf Pasha. The treaty is written as follows:

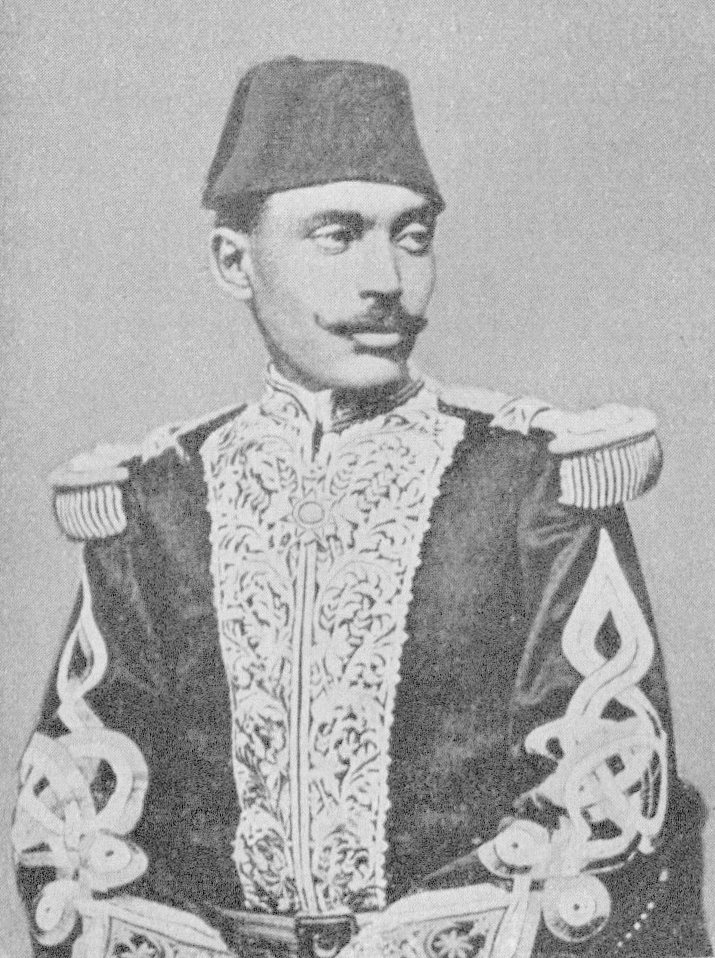
Photo of Rauf Pasha Egyptian governor of Harar

"Praise to be God alone and blessings and peace be upon him after whom there will be no prophet.

I declare [as follow]. I, Muhammad bin ‘Ali, the Emir of Harar, in obedience to God and His Prophet, and also in obedience to the most honored, the most illustrious, the glory of Islam and the Muslims, the supporter of the law of the Master of the prophets, the guarantor of victorious armies, Muhammad Ra‘uf Pasha – may God increase his power and fulfill his plans – who is under the mighty lord, the venerable ruler, endowed with conquests which are constantly repeated, and privileges which adorn themselves in the pearlstring of their beauty, the excellent of [our] time, our lord, Khedive Isma‘il, the son of our Lord Ibrahim – may the stars of his happiness rise in brightness and the squadrons of his soldiers advance in victory – surrender completely of my own free will and in full possession of all my senses, I and the people under my control and my country, as I have said [before] and even if I had not said so. I entreat God Almighty to make the authority of the Khedive everlasting. My desire is to be under the rule of the Khedive so that he may protect myself, my property and my family, and I hope that, as a reward for my friendship, His Highness the Khedive will issue a generous firman for me, so that the emirate will belong to me and my offspring after me. This will keep me and my offspring loyal forever. May God help me to fulfill the demands of my benefactor, the great Khedive. I ask you, O Pasha, to show this to the great Khedive."

After the ratification of this treaty, a power struggle took place between the Emir Muhammed 'Abd ash-Shakur and Muhammed Ra'uf Pasha. The Emir supposedly refused to come and see Ra'uf Pasha on his request, since he felt that it was below him and it is the Egyptian who should come to him. Ra'uf Pasha sent soldiers after him and the emir was strangled in the ensuing struggle. Harari informants claim that, Ali Abu Bakr, a relative of the emir who was imprisoned due to their political rivalry, conspired against the deposed emir and treacherously convinced the Egyptians that the emir and his loyalists to open the city gates to Oromo warriors during the night on October 26, 1875, as it was a Muslim festival called the Night of Power. It was Harari tradition that on that festival drums were played and Ali Abu Bakr supposedly deceived the Egyptians that on the sign of a drumbeat, the Oromo were supposed to attack them in their sleep. The Egyptians thus awaited the signal and killed the emir as soon as the drums sounded.

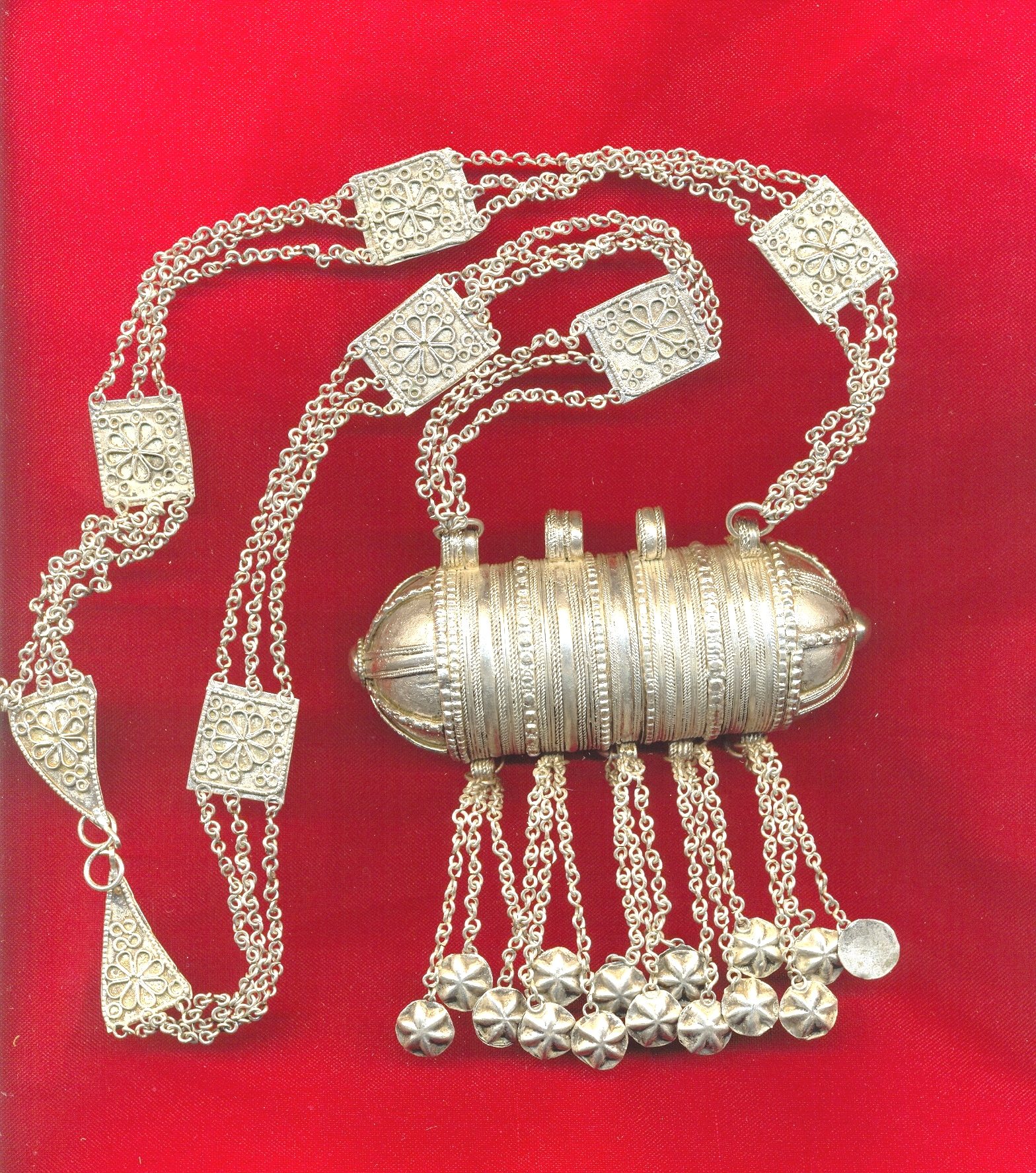
Necklace jewelry produced during the Emirate.

After the death of Emir Muhammed 'Abd ash-Shakur, Ra'uf Pasha became the ruler of Harar with complete power. He had taken forcible measures to ensure that fallow land was planted with grain or coffee. He levied tax on crops and livestock in order to encourage settlement and further cultivation. He also reorganized and established a new local urban administration and its institutions; i.e. he introduced some additional systems, while keeping most with minor changes to strengthen his public administration . He noticed that western part of Harar was uncultivated and after suppressing rebellions encouraged the locals to cultivate their lands but those who hesitated to begin planting grain and coffee were attacked until they agreed to nominate leaders who would be responsible for parcels of virgin land. In March 1876, Rauf claimed that two hundred and fifty settlements had been founded in this way since the conquest. Each was under a notable who had been given the Harari title, Garad; a cape, turban and robe; and a deed entitling him to fixed units of land, in return for a fee in cattle and the commission to collect tithe on the harvest and herds of the new settlement. Communications improved, and substantial public works were undertaken during his tenure of office; most of the trade was routed through Jarso and Nole clans, to and from the coast. Some edifices were built in this period, such as the Arab Mosque, the premises of today's municipality office.

Due to the unpopularity of Emir Muhammed 'Abd ash-Shakur due to his favoring of the neighboring Oromo people, the locals of Harar had a favorable approach to the Egyptians as they were seen as a gift sent from heaven that would remove the yoke of Afran-Qallo tyranny. The governor noticed this and encouraged his soldiers to marry local women as according to the Egyptian narrative, for a Harari to marry off his daughter to an Egyptian was seen as a desirable thing or even some sort of privilege. More than one hundred Egyptian soldiers decided to stay behind in Harar due to their marriages with Harari women. Major Hunter, an Anglo-Egyptian soldier, attested to these relationships where Harari women married Egyptian soldiers and established families According to Harari informants, they claimed that the Egyptian soldiers were notorious for raping local women. As Harari tradition stated, these violations caused women to begin wearing tight-fitting pants during the Egyptian occupation that would make such forceful assaults less easy to execute.

== Law ==
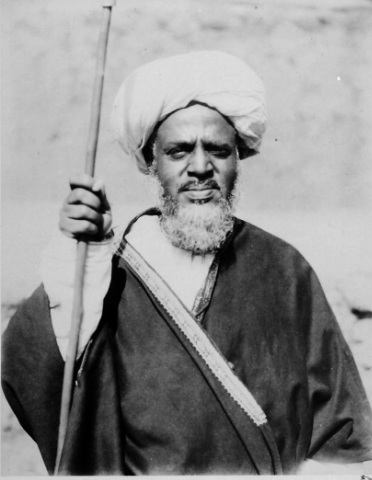
Qadi of Harar in 1885

The amir's decree was absolute; he occasionally sought the counsel of Kabirs, appointing them to advisory positions within the council. Within the administrative framework, there existed the diwan, an institution where the qadi was selected by religious scholars and sanctioned by the amir. The diwan functioned as a religious body that upheld Sharia law in relation to civil and criminal issues. The qadi's responsibility included maintaining records pertaining to inheritance, disputes, and transactions. The documents preserved in the archives encompassed matters of marriage, divorce, commercial transactions, and inheritance.

== Military ==
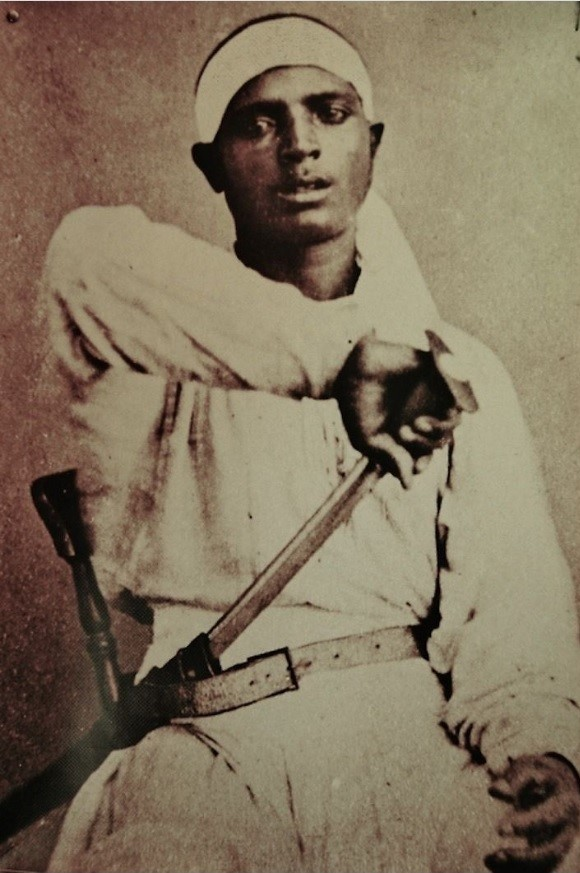
Photo of Harari warrior in 1883 taken by Arthur Rimbaud

As stated by Abdurahman Garad, the inheritance documents from the nineteenth century indicate that the citizens of the state primarily owned lances and, on rare occasions, swords. In contrast, firearms were solely utilized by the official military of the kingdom, known as the Malassay. The Malassay armed forces were typically commanded by the Garad of Sim.

In 1842 British deputy W.C. Barker describes the Emirate's armed forces:

"The military force of Harrar is very small, consisting of from 150 to 200 matchlock men, 100 cavalry armed with long spears, 60 spearman on foot, and a few archers. Insignificant, however, as this force really is, the matchlockmen alone render it far superior to that of the neighboring tribes, who have a great dread of fire-arms; they have not even a single matchlock in their possession."

Historian Abdullahi Mohammed asserts that the endurance of the Emirate was largely attributable to the military strategies implemented by the state, as well as the persistent threats it encountered, which prompted a rapid response from the population.

== Economy ==
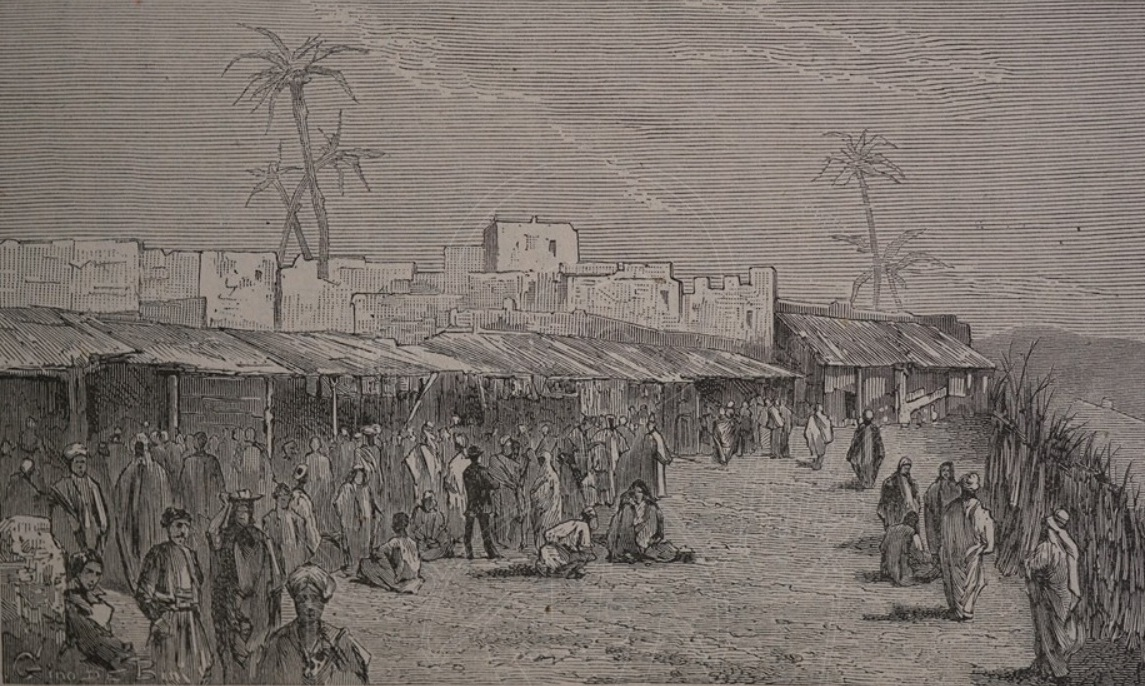
Market of Harar city in the nineteenth century by Antonio Cecchi

The Emirs of Harar implemented a policy to ensure the presence of representatives in all locations with which Harar engaged in significant commercial interactions. Emirate appointed merchant agents (wakil) to act on behalf of the state, as noted by the nineteenth-century English traveler Henry Salt in Mokha. Commercial relations existed between the state and port cities such as Mogadishu, Berbera, Tadjoura, Zeila, and Zanzibar in the extreme south. The emirate exported a wide range of goods, such as grain, coffee, chat, honey, and salt.

Nineteenth century French trader Charles-Xavier Rochet d'Héricourt on Harari traders stated:

The population of Harar is undoubtedly the most industrious in East Africa, the one whose skills have been most successfully applied to trade: the inhabitants of Harar are even the true agents of commerce in this part of Africa; they penetrate far south of Guraj; none of the languages spoken by the various tribes of these remote regions are unknown to them. This small people therefore offers an immense interest to European science and commerce; for it will undoubtedly be very useful to travelers who strive to reach the center of the African continent from the east.

In the 1800s, there were also trade with nearby areas like Ifat, Aussa, Arusi, and Bale. Harar was also able to connect with the east and west shores of the Red Sea, cities on the Persian coast, and even towns in India, like Bombay and Karachi. Merchants purchased enslaved individuals imported from the Kingdom of Kaffa and nearby areas at the market in Shewa, located in Abyssinia. The products they imported included mostly fabrics from Europe, America, or India, metals like copper, zinc, and lead, as well as beads, coral-colored silk threads, salt, dates, rice, and sugar. In the early 19th century, British diplomat William Cornwallis Harris reported that Aliyu Amba functioned as the primary town facilitating trade between Abyssinia and Harari brokers. He also noted that the emir of Harar profited from this arrangement.

== Religion ==
Its inhabitants followed Sunni Islam. Among the notable Islamic scholars in the 18th century was Hāšim b. ʿAbdalʿazīz, a grandson of the emir Hashim b. Ali b. Daud, who adhered to the Shafi‘i school and the Ash‘ari creed.

== Relationship with neighboring groups ==
=== Oromo ===
The formation of the Emirate of Harar in the mid-seventeenth century failed to halt the decline. In the end of the eighteenth century, the Oromo tribes in the region of Harar were still slowly expanding their territories at the expense of their neighbors. They squeezed the Afar out of the last fertile areas which they possessed on the edges of the Harar plateau. They completely overran the region between Harar and Shewa, which was considered the property of the Amir. They fought the Somalis to the south and to the west of the town, and they slowly penetrated even the lands held by the Harari, a short distance from the town. According to Harari documents, even during the earlier emirs' epochs, marriages with Oromo women were frequent. Emir 'Abdallah ibn Ali, the successor of Ali ibn Da'ud, had two wives of Oromo heritage. In the 19th century Richard F. Burton stated "Up to the city gates (of Harar) the country is peopled by the Gallas. This unruly race requires to be propitiated by presents of cloth; as many as 600 Tobes are annually distributed amongst them by the Amir."

=== Somalis ===
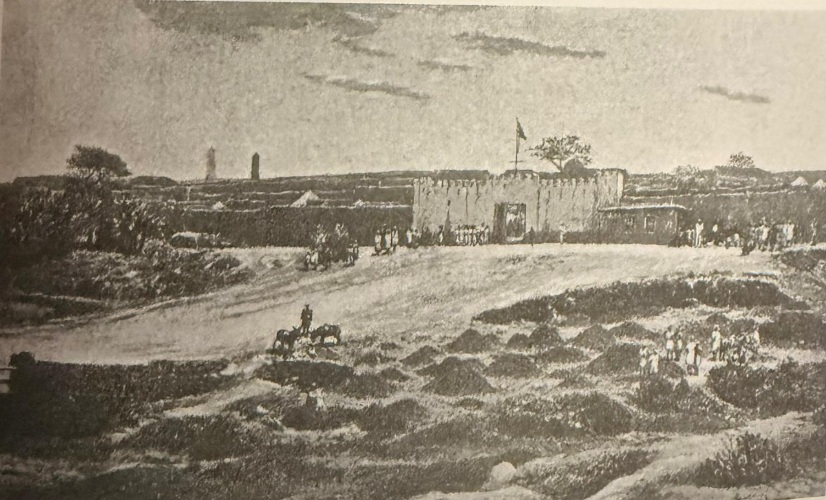
Illustration of Harar city gate, Asmadin Bari in the nineteenth century by Philipp Paulitschke

The Emirate of Harar consisted of a sizeable Somali population. Richard Burton at the time also noted that the Habr Awal had strong ties to the Emirate of Harar and Emirs would hold Habr Awal merchants in their court with high esteem with Richard Burton noting their influence in Emir Ahmad III ibn Abu Bakr's court and discussions.

Historian Abdurahman Garad, discusses policies the emirate had implemented regarding Somali peoples that inhabited the region:

For strategic and practical reasons, however, the Harari were unable or not allowed to carry out such punitive actions against the nomadic Somalis. This also explains their political strategy towards them, which consisted of refraining from imposing territorial rule on them, as they had done with some success over the sedentary highlanders. Instead, the emirs endeavoured to bring the individual Somali tribes more or less under their control through diplomatic means, primarily by means of intermarriage with the most powerful chiefs.

In the late 1800s the sister of the last Emir of Harar Abdullahi II was wed to a member of the Ughaz.

== Emirs of Harar (Ali ibn Dawud dynasty) ==
	Name	Reign	Note
1	Emīr ʿAli ibn Dā'ūd	1647–1662	Founder of the Emirate of Harar
2	Emīr Hāshim ibn ʿAli	1662–1671	Son of Emīr ʿAli
3	Emīr ʿAbdullah ibn ʿAli	1671–1700	Son of Emīr ʿAli
4	Emīr Ṭalḥa ibn ʿAbdullah	1700–1721	Son of Emīr ʿAbdullah
5	Emīr Abūbakar ibn ʿAbdullah	1721–1732	Son of Emīr ʿAbdullah
6	Emīr Khalaf ibn Abūbakar	1732–1733	Son of Emīr Abūbakar
7	Emīr Ḥāmid ibn Abūbakar	1733–1747	Son of Emīr Abūbakar
8	Emīr Yūsuf ibn Abūbakar	1747–1755	Son of Emīr Abūbakar
9	Emīr Aḥmed ibn Abūbakar	1755–1782	Son of Emīr Abūbakar
10	Emīr Maḥamed ibn Yūsuf	1782–1783	Son of Emīr Yūsuf
11	Emīr ʿAbdalshakūr ibn Yūsuf	1783–1794	Son of Emīr Yūsuf
12	Emīr Aḥmed ibn Maḥamed	1794–1821	Son of Emīr Maḥamed
13	Emīr ʿAbdalraḥmān ibn Maḥamed	1821–1825	Son of Emīr Maḥamed
14	Emīr ʿAbdulkarīm ibn Maḥamed	1825–1834	Son of Emīr Maḥamed
15	Emīr Abūbakar ibn ʿAbdalmanān	1834–1852	Grandson of Emīr Maḥamed
16	Emīr Aḥmed ibn Abūbakar	1852–1856	Son of Emīr Abūbakar
17	Emīr Maḥamed ibn ʿAli ʿAbdalshakūr	1856–1875	Grandson of Emīr ʿAbdalshakūr, deposed by the Khedivate of Egypt
--	Khedivate of Egypt	1875–1882	Egypt annexed Harar in 1875
--	British Empire	1882–1884	Britain annexed Egypt in 1882, subsequently occupying Harar. In 1884 with the signing of an agreement with France following tensions with the colonial power, they would relinquish control of Harar.
18	Emīr ʿAbdullah ibn Maḥamed	1884–1887	Son of Emīr Maḥamed (17), his rule and Harar's briefly renewed independence were both ended by the invasion of Harar by the Shewa kingdom in 1887.

=== Family tree ===
Ali ibn Dawud dynasty

Ali ibn Dawud; 1620s-1671 Emir of Harar r. 1647-1662
Hashim ibn Ali; Emir of Harar r. 1662-1671	Abd Allah I ibn Ali; Emir of Harar r. 1671-1700
Talha ibn Abd Allah; Emir of Harar r. 1700-1721	Abu Bakr I ibn Abd Allah; Emir of Harar r. 1721-1732
Khalaf ibn Abi Bakr; Emir of Harar r. 1732-1733	Hamid ibn Abi Bakr; Emir of Harar r. 1733-1747	Yusuf ibn Abi Bakr; Emir of Harar r. 1747-1755	Ahmad I ibn Abi Bakr; 1710s-1782 Emir of Harar r. 1755-1782
Muhammad I ibn Yusuf; Emir of Harar r. 1782-1783	Abd al-Shakur ibn Yusuf; 1750s-1794 Emir of Harar r. 1783-1794
?
Ahmad II ibn Muhammad; 1770s-1821 Emir of Harar r. 1794-1821	Abd al-Rahman ibn Muhammad; 1790s-1840s Emir of Harar r. 1821-1825	Abd al-Karim ibn Muhammad; 1790s-1834 Emir of Harar r. 1825-1834	Abd al-Mannan ibn Muhammad; Garad of Zeila	Ali
Abu Bakr II ibn Abd al-Mannan; 1800s-1852 Emir of Harar r. 1834-1852	Muhammad II; Ibn Ali ?-1875; Emir of Harar r. 1856-1875
Ahmad III ibn Abi Bakr; 1830s-1856 Emir of Harar r. 1852-1856	Abd Allah II ibn Muhammad; 1850s-1930 Emir of Harar r. 1884-1887

== Egyptian Governors of Harar ==
	Name	Reign	Note
1	Muhammad Rauf Pasha	1875–1878	Leads the Egyptian annexation of Harar and is appointed governor
2	Ridhwan Pasha	1878–1880	Successor of Ra'uf Pasha
3	Muhammed Nadi Pasha	1880–1883	Successor of Ridhwan Pasha
4	'Ali Ridha Pasha	1883–1884	Successor of Muhammed Nadi Pasha

== See also ==
- Hararghe
- Egyptian Invasion of Harar
- Islam Hadhari
