= Harar =

Capital of Harari Region, Ethiopia

Harar ሀረር / هَرَرْ (Harari) ሐረር (Amharic)
- Capital and walled city
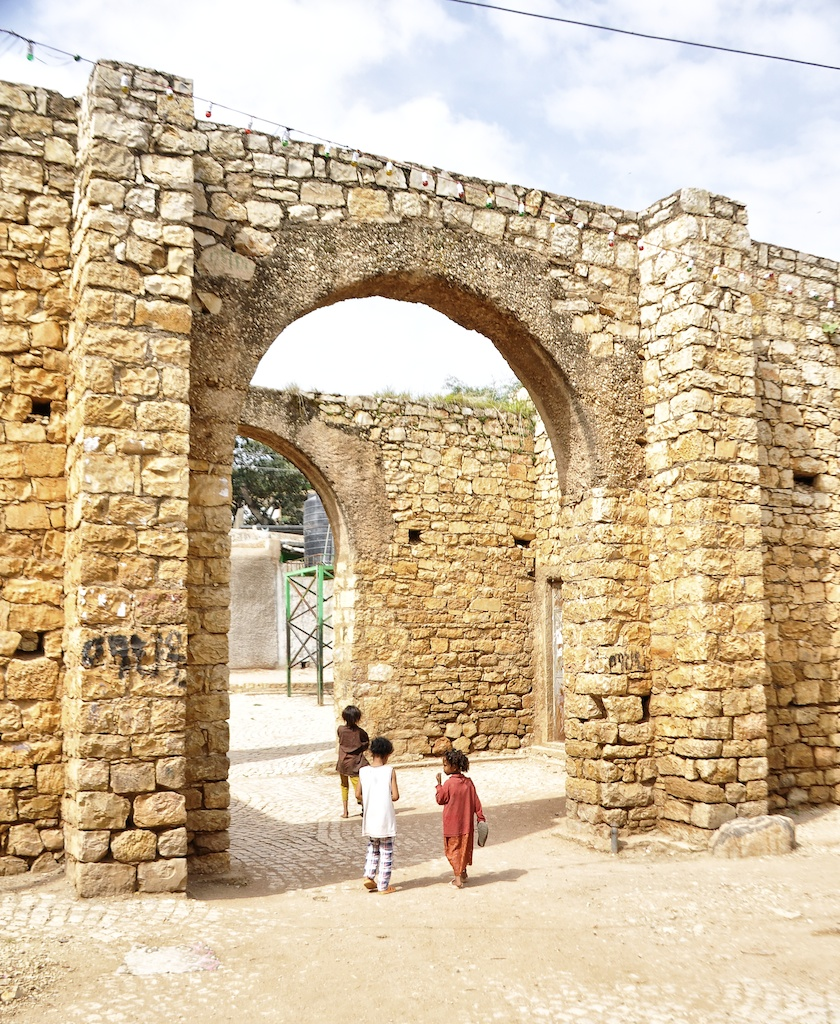
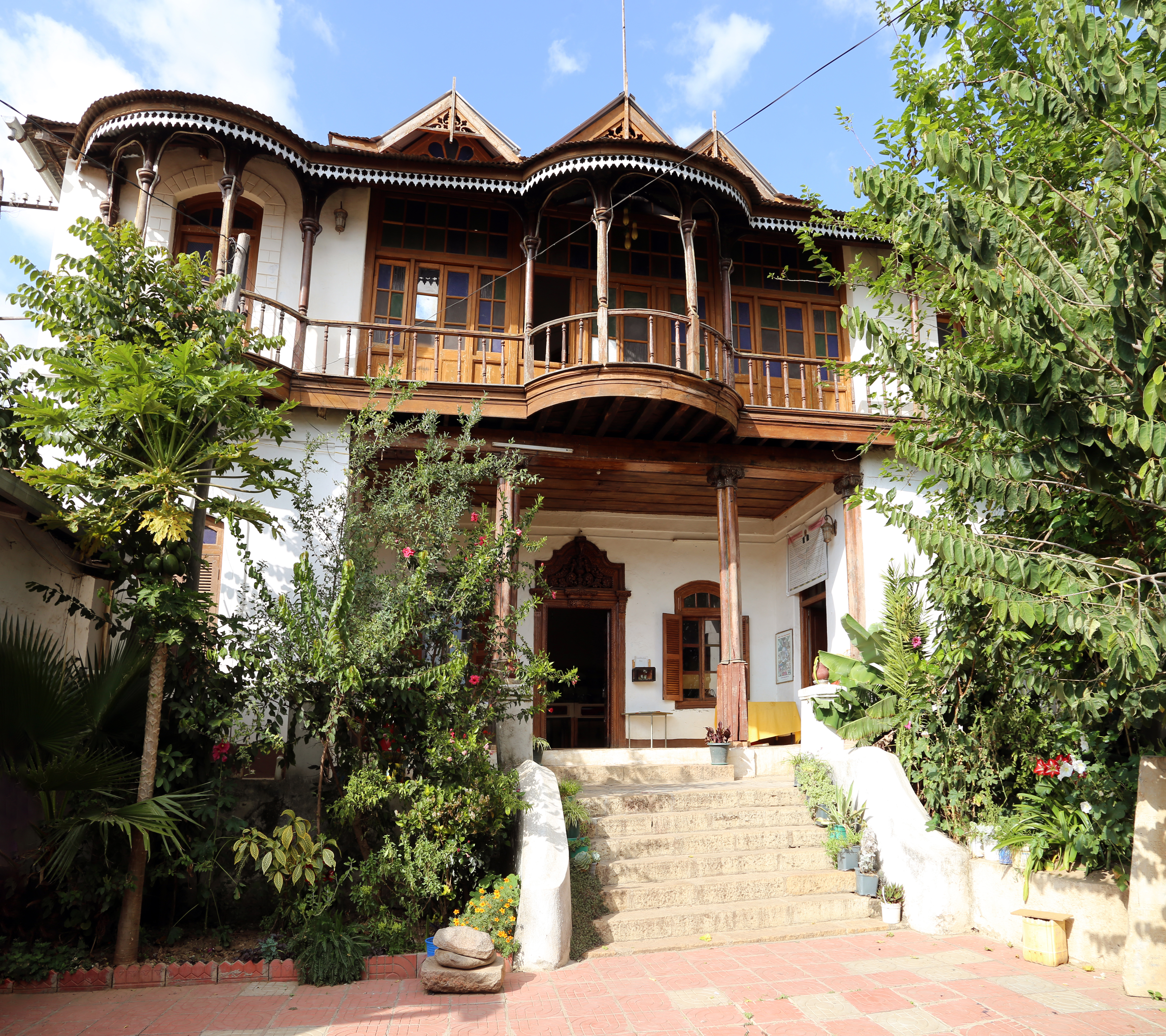
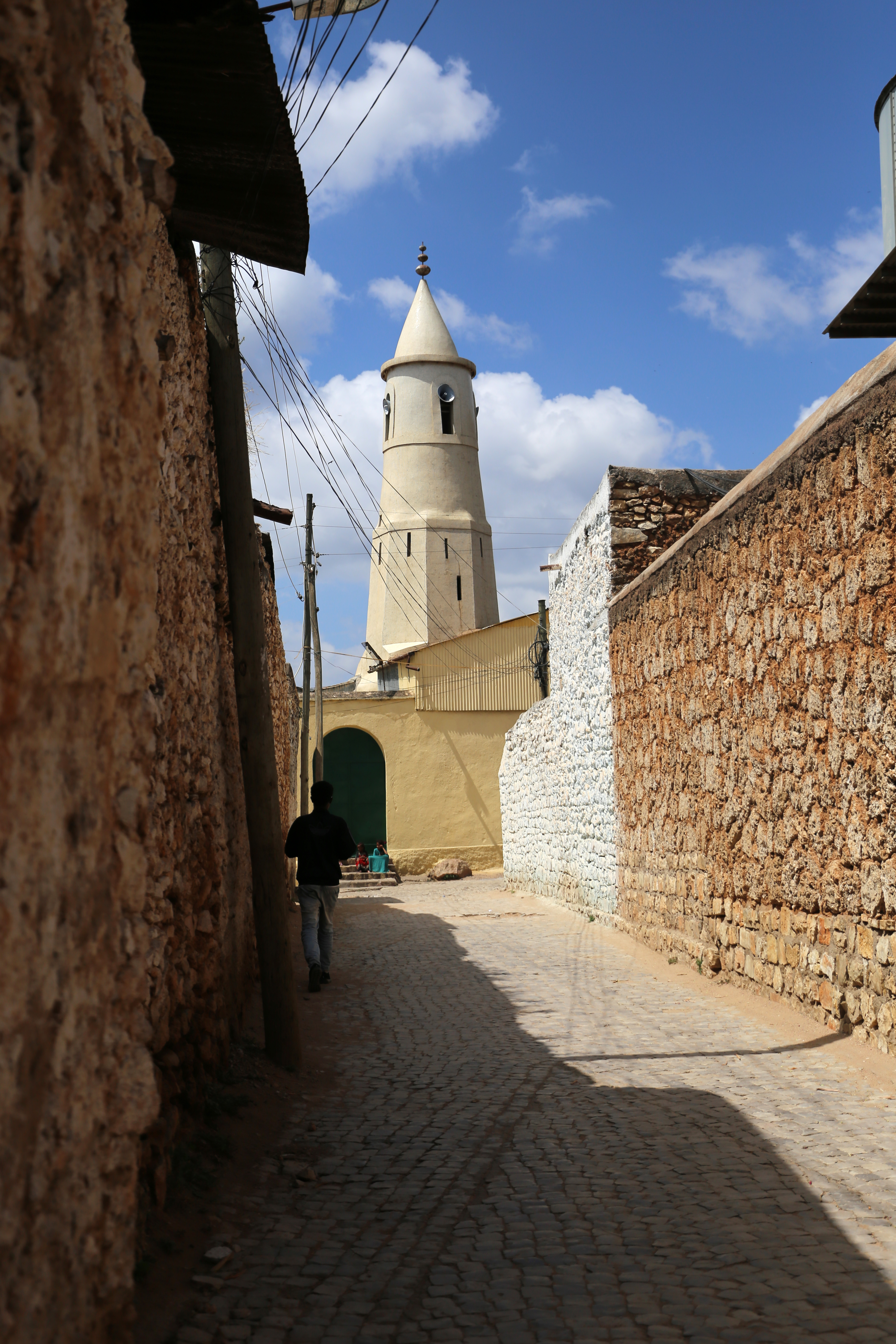
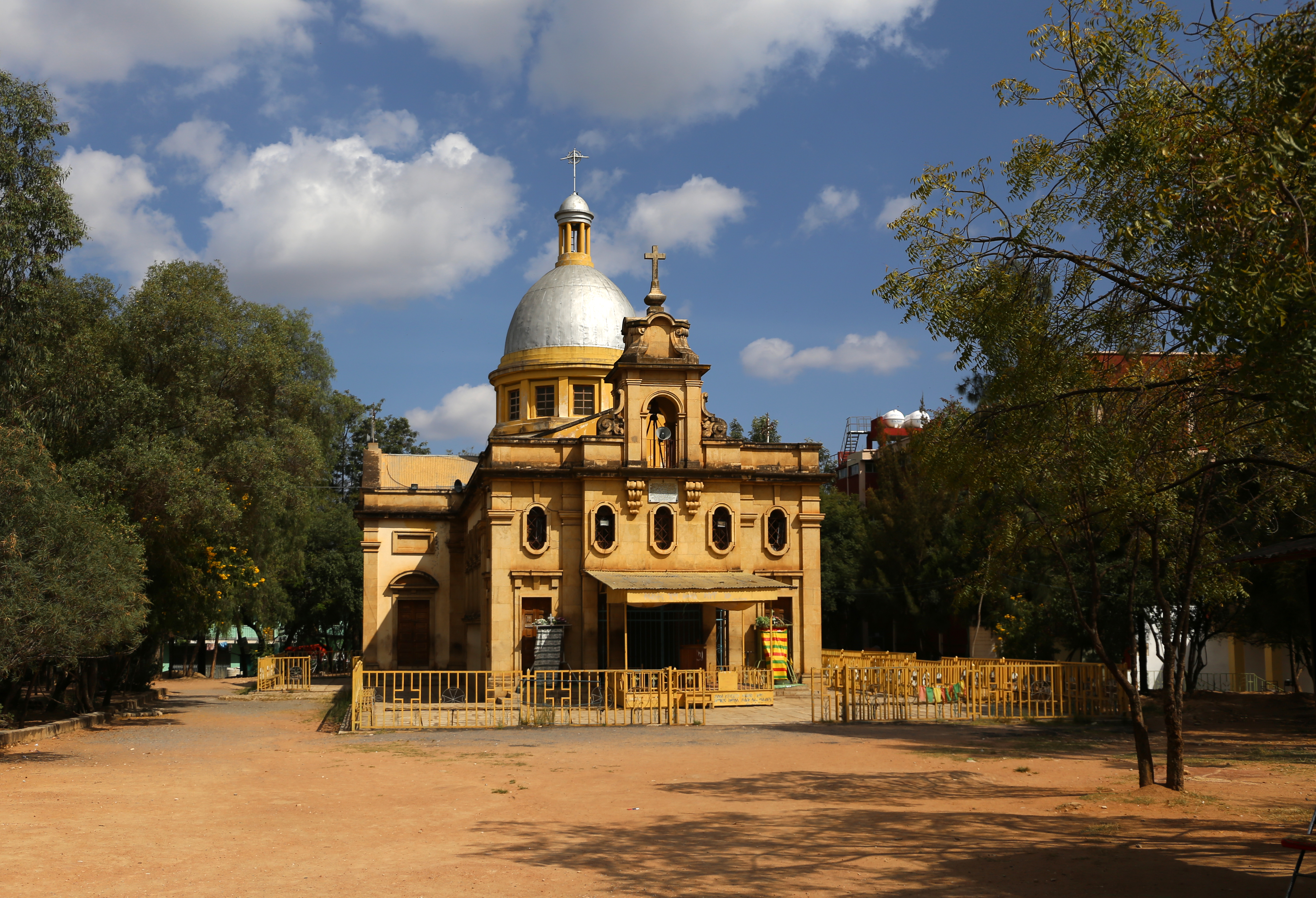
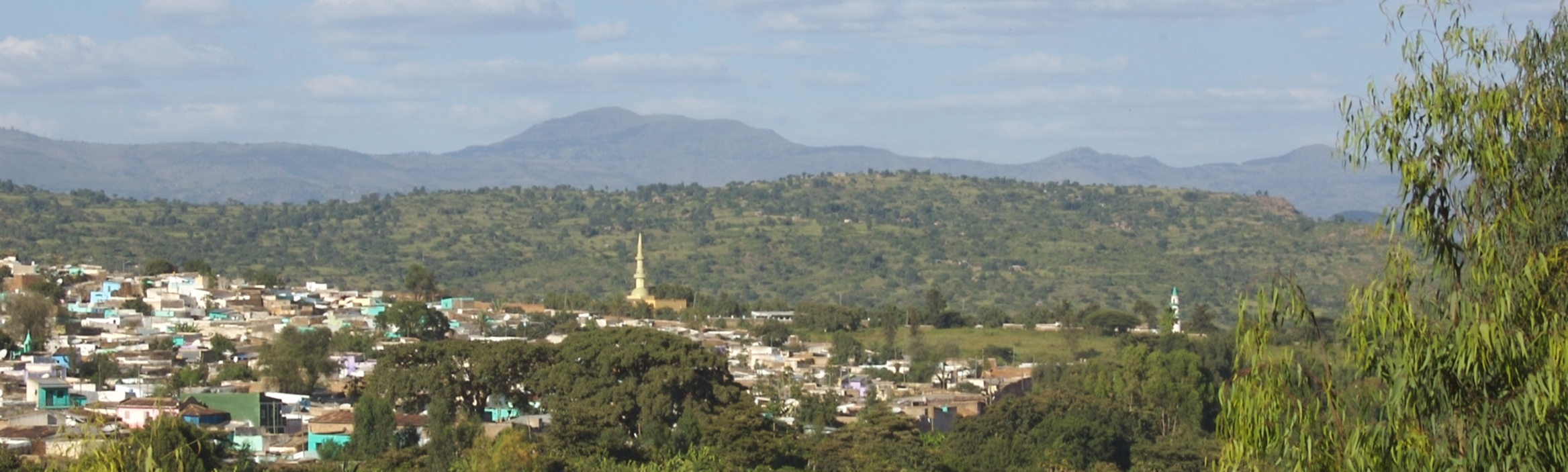
- From top, left to right: Badro Gate; Sherif Museum; Jamia Mosque; Chesa Selassie Church; city distant view
- Nickname: City of Saints (مدينة الأَوْلِيَا)
- Location within Ethiopia Location within the Horn of Africa Location within Africa
- Coordinates: 9°18′40″N 42°7′40″E
- Country: Ethiopia
- Region: (Harari Region) Harari

Government
  - President: Ordin Bedri
- Elevation: 1,885 m (6,184 ft)

Population (2007)
  - Total: 99,368
  - Estimate (2021): 153,000
- Time zone: UTC+3 (EAT)

UNESCO World Heritage Site
- Official name: Harar Jugol, the Fortified Historic Town
- Criteria: Cultural: ii, iii, iv, v
- Reference: 1189
- Inscription: 2006 (30th Session)
- Area: 48 ha (120 acres)

Harar (Note: Formerly written as Harrar; other variants include Hārer and Harer.) (Harari: ሀረር / Old Harari: هَرَرْ; Amharic: ሐረር; Oromo: Adare Biyyo; Somali: Harar; Arabic: هرر), known historically by the indigenous as Harar-Gey or simply Gey (Harari: ጌይ, Old Harari: ݘٛىيْ, romanized: Gēy, lit. 'the city'), is a walled city in eastern Ethiopia. It is also known in Arabic as the City of Saints (Arabic: مدينة الأولياء, romanized: Madīnat al-ʾAwliyāʾ).

Harar is the capital city of the Harari Region. The ancient city is located on a hilltop in the eastern part of the country and is about 500 kilometres (310 mi) from the Ethiopian capital Addis Ababa at an elevation of 1,885 metres (6,184 ft).

For centuries, Harar has been a major commercial center, linked by the trade routes with the rest of Ethiopia, the entire Horn of Africa, the Arabian Peninsula, Asia, and through its ports, the outside world. Harar Jugol, the old walled city, was listed as a World Heritage Site in 2006 by UNESCO in recognition of its cultural heritage. Because of Harar's long history of involvement during times of trade in the Arabian Peninsula, the Government of Ethiopia has made it a criminal offence to demolish or interfere with any historical sites or fixtures in the city. These include stone homes, museums and items discarded from war. According to UNESCO, it is "considered 'the fourth holiest city' of Islam" with 82 mosques, three of which date from the 10th century, and 102 shrines.

Yahyá Naṣrallāh's Fatḥ Madīnat Harar, an unpublished history of the city in the 13th century, records that the legendary saint Abadir Umar ar-Rida and several other religious leaders settled in the Harar plateau c. 1216 (612 AH). Harar was later made the new capital of the Adal Sultanate in 1520 by the Sultan Abu Bakr ibn Muhammad. The city saw a political decline during the ensuing Emirate of Harar, only regaining some significance in the Khedivate of Egypt period. During the Ethiopian Empire, the city decayed while maintaining a certain cultural prestige.

== Etymology ==
The etymology of the name "Harar" remains ambiguous; however, archaeologist Timothy Insoll suggests that it may be derived from Harla, an ancient group that existed prior to the arrival of the Oromo people in the area. Other possible etymologies include ones put forth by British explorer Richard Francis Burton who states Harar is an extract of the name of a plain located south of the town or a specific tree.

Harar and its residents were also historically known as Hadharee by outsiders in the region. In the Arabic language, حضاري (ḥaḍārī) serves as both the noun and the adjective that refers to an urban inhabitant and everything associated with a permanent settlement.

== History ==
=== Origins ===
When Harar was founded is unclear and various dates have been suggested, some state the city was founded by Qurayshi settlers in the late 7th century or a local creation in the 10th century. Islam had gained a foothold on the Harar plateau by the 10th–11th centuries CE via trade with Zeila. By the 13th century, Islam had become the predominant religion in the region.

It is likely the original inhabitants of the region were the Harla people. Harar was part of the Harla Kingdom's domain in the sixth century. In the Islamic period, the city was under an alliance called the confederated states of Zeila. According to the 12th-century Jewish traveler Benjamin of Tudela, the Zeila was the land of the Havilah, confined by al-Habash in the west. In the ninth century, Harar was under the Maḥzūmī dynasty's Sultanate of Shewa.

According to the semi-legendary text Fatḥ Madīnat Harar, the founder of the city was saint Abadir Umar ar-Rida, who along with 405 other saints such as Aw Barkhadle, Isma'il al-Jabarti and Umardin bin Qutbaddan came from the Arabian Peninsula to settle in the Harar plateau and founded the city circa 612H (1216 CE). Abadir was supposedly met by the Argobba, the Gaturi and the Harla people who accepted his leadership. In 1234, Abadir returned to Mecca where he stayed until 1279. In the meantime Harar was ruled by several other saints, most of whom were killed fighting the Christians. Coming back from Mecca, Abadir continued to fight the Christians until his final victory over them in 1301. According to tradition, Abadir's brother Fakr ad-Din founded the Sultanate of Mogadishu, while one of his descendants founded the Hadiya Sultanate.

The first mention of Harar comes from the 14th-century chronicles of Amda Seyon I, according to this text, in 1332 Gēt (Harar) sent 3 governors to support Salih against the Emperor's invasion of Adal at the Battle of Das. This reference suggests that Harar had obtained some importance by the first half of the 14th century. The region became the base for the Walashma after their return from Yemen in 1415 with the foundation of the Adal Sultanate. The Walashma rulers established their residence in nearby Dakkar, which was likely in very close proximity to Harar.

Tradition states the Siltʼe, Wolane, Halaba and Harari people lived in Harar, while the former three moved to the Gurage region.

=== Adal Sultanate era (Late Middle Ages) ===
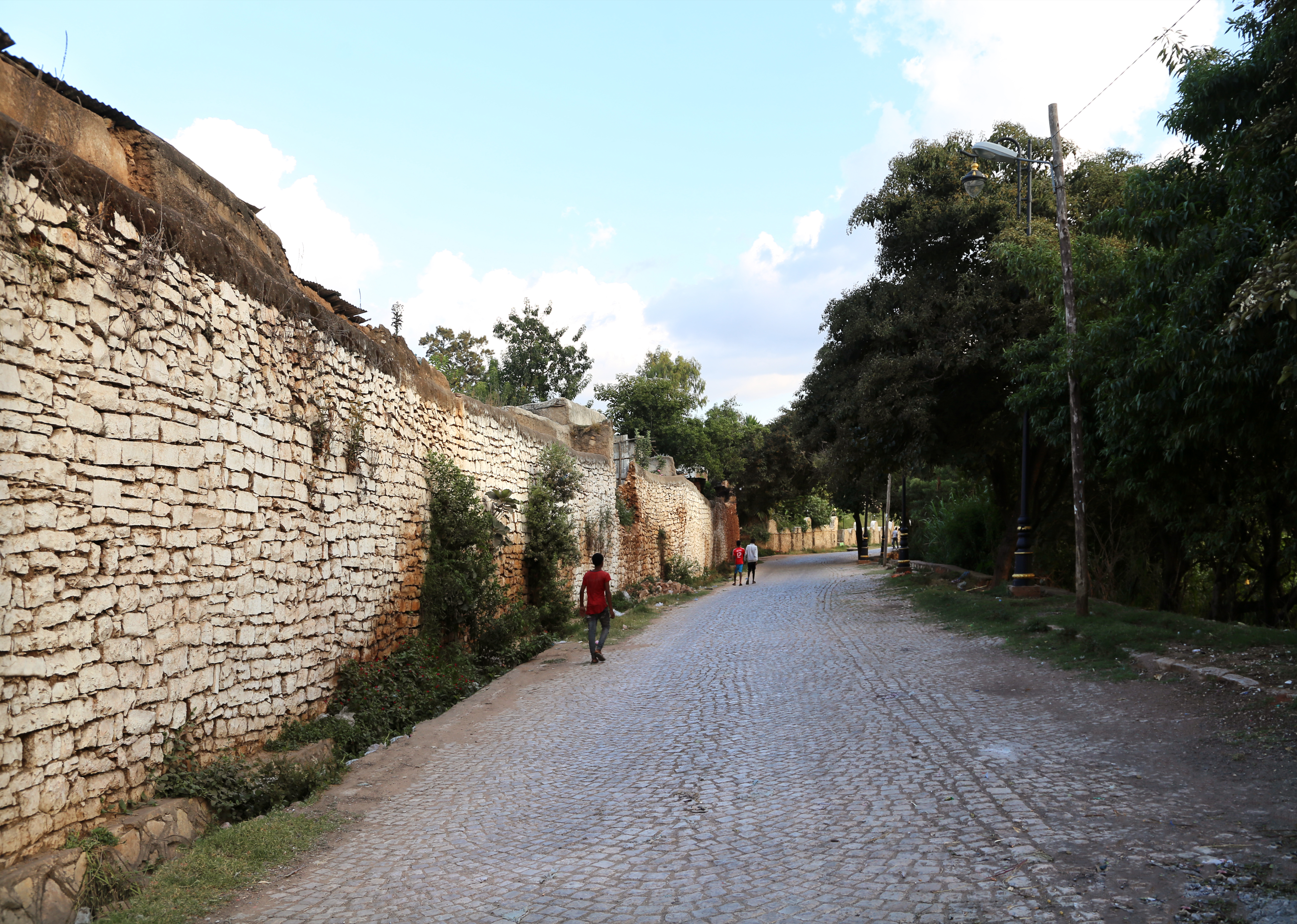
Harar city wall built during the Adal Sultanate in the 1500s

In 1520, the city became the capital of the Adal Sultanate under Sultan Abu Bakr ibn Muhammad after his victory over the religious faction led by Abun Adashe. At this point, the religious faction fighting against the Walashma came under the control of Imam Ahmad ibn Ibrahim al-Ghazi also known as "Gragn" or "Gurey", both meaning "the Left-handed". The town's clergy attempted to mediate between both sides, but the Imam was strengthened by a recent victory over an Ethiopian raid, and was able to defeat and killed the Sultan in 1525. Imam Ahmad then installed Umar Din as a puppet sultan and made Harar the center of his various campaigns which ravaged most of Christian Ethiopia.

After Imam Ahmad's defeat in 1543, his men were dispersed back to the region of Harar. The dead leader's widow, Bati del Wambara, undertook to renew jihad against the Christians. She invaded the highlands in 1548, but repulsed by Ras Fanu'el. In 1551, Nur ibn Mujahid married Bati del Wambara and became the new ruler of Harar. In 1559 he departed on a jihad (holy war) to Fatagar, during his absence, the Ethiopians under Ras Hamalmal breached the city and killed the last Walashma Sultan Barakat ibn Umar Din. However this victory was short-lived as Nur was able to defeat and kill Gelawdewos at the Battle of Fatagar, and brought his head back to Harar in triumph.

The following years were very difficult for Harar, as the Oromo were able to intrude on Hararghe and defeated Nur's army at the Battle of Hazalo. This prompted Nur to construct a large wall around Harar, which served as a successful bulwark against the Oromo who devastated only the lands around Harar and forced Nur to fight them multiple times. Because of the influx of refugees into the town and the devastation of the region by the Oromo, Harar experienced two severe famines. The prices of food and livestock rose significantly: one sa'a (a unit equal to four handfuls) of sorghum cost 12 ashrafis, and an equal amount of salt cost 15. A cow cost over 300 ashrafis. The second famine was followed by a plague which eventually killed Nur in 1568, three months after he conducted a campaign against the Oromo.

After the death of Nur ibn Mujahid, for the next following decade Harar would fall into a state of political instability, mainly due to the pressures of the Oromo. Nur was succeeded by Uthman the Abyssinian, who soon came into conflict with the ulama as he did not strictly observe sharia among the nobility and had made a humiliating peace agreement with the pagan Oromo by granting them special privileges. A local official of Aussa named Jibril denounced what he considered Uthman's transgressions against Islamic law. The conflict came to a head when a local Muslim woman who had been taken by the pagan Oromos arrived as a refugee to Aussa. Uthman ordered Jibril to return the woman to the Oromos, Jibril refused, declaring that doing so would be contrary to God's law. Uthman dispatched an army against Jibril, who was defeated and killed. However, while Uthman was gone the clergymen of Harar elected Talha ibn Abbas as the new leader, he was then able to ambush and defeat Uthman, which led to much rejoicing in the city.

However Tahla Abbas was again overthrown by some of his very fanatical subjects who still longed for a jihad against Ethiopia. He was replaced by Nasir ibn Uthman, who was almost immediately succeeded by his son, Muhammad ibn Nasir. He led an unsuccessful fight against the Christians, he met Emperor Sarsa Dengel at the Battle of Webi River but was betrayed by his own officers, which led him to get captured and executed by the Emperor with other Harari officials. While he was gone, Harar was attacked by the Oromos, his brother, wazir Hamid ibn Nasir was not able to repulse him, and was wounded in the fight. As a result, a local official named Mansur ibn Muhammad, recruited bands of Somali warriors and repel the Oromo attack, and then subsequently declared himself sultan. After repelling the Oromos, he then turned north against the governor of Aussa, but was attacked and killed by his own soldiers. Muhammad Gasa, a descendant of Ahmad Gragn, took advantage of the situation and moved the capital to Aussa, thus founding the Imamate of Aussa, from then on Harar was ruled by a local wazir.

The first wazir to govern Harar under the Imamate of Aussa was Muhammad Gasa's own brother, Muhammad Gasa II, who later became the Imam in Aussa in 1584. The next year, Harar was ruled by wazir Saddadin, who participated in the war between Muhammad Gasa II and his minister Abbas ibn Muhammad. After this, mentions of Harar in the historical record is sporadic, with the exception of the names of some of its rulers, the first being Sabraddin ibn Adam (1620–5), Sadiq (1632–46) and his son Abram, who only ruled for eleven months.

=== Harar Emirate (Dawud dynasty 17th century onwards) ===
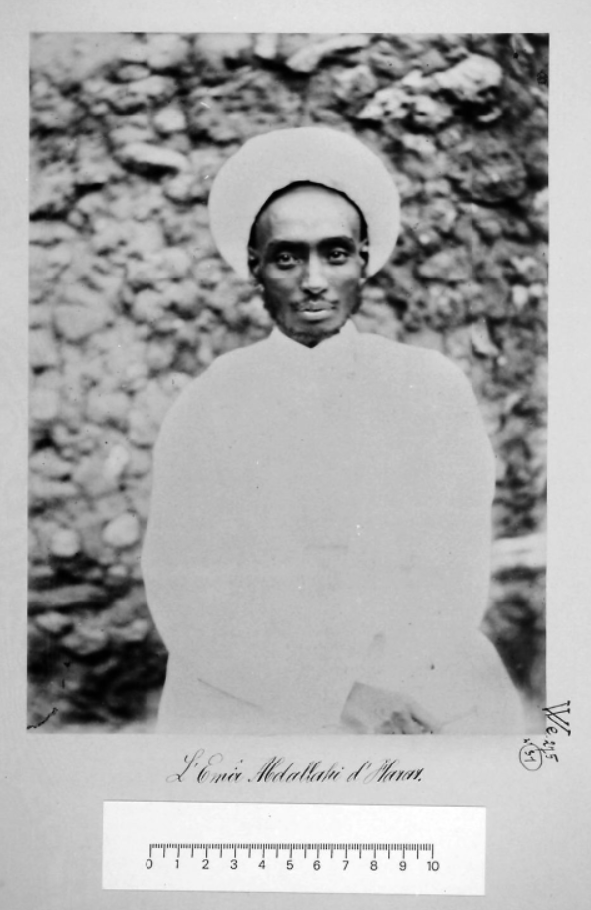
Abdullahi, the last emir of Harar

A certain Emir Ahmed, the son of Wazir Abram, had reigned for 10 days when `Ali ibn Da`ud assumed the throne of Harar, thus founding the Emirate of Harar. `Ali ibn Da`ud had risen through the ranks with previous occupations such as being a head of a district and the minister, had declared independence and founded a dynasty that would rule the city for the next two centuries. The reign of Ali saw significant problems with the neighboring Oromos, as on 1 September 1662 Emir Ali ibn Da'ud had to face a violent Illamo Oromo raid which, had reached as near as Asmadin gate and killed his son Sabr ad-Din ibn al-Amir 'Ali b. Da'ud. Ali's successor, Abdullah, significantly improved relations with the Oromos through an extensive marriage policy by marrying 5 of his sons to Oromo women. The Oromos by now had adopted agriculture and conducted trade with the inhabitants of Harar, allowing them to buy imported goods at the markets of the town. With this, the economic influence of Harar extended from Shewa to the west and Zeila to the east, with some overseas connections. The Emirate of Harar also began to mint its own currency, the earliest possible issues bearing a date that may be read as 615 AH (1218/19 CE); but the first coins were definitely issued by 1789 CE, and more were issued into the 19th century.

Harar began to develop into a major religious center in the region, serving as a source of Islamic proselytization to the surrounding Oromo tribes. In 1761 Ahmad I ibn Abi Bakr constructed the minaret of the grand mosque, and ʽAbd al-Shakur ibn Yusuf built a mosque in Bale. Abd al-Shakur also reintroduced the register and the chancery in the town, which strengthened the influence of the clergy. The religious importance of Harar can be further seen in the migration of various sharifs from Mecca to the town around the same time.

After the death of Emir Ahmad II ibn Muhammad in 1821, a new conflict arose between the brothers ʽAbd ar-Rahman ibn Muhammad and ʽAbd al-Karim ibn Muhammad, which gave the surrounding Oromo and Somali tribes an opportunity to interfere in Harari politics. In 1825, the Oromo imprisoned ʽAbd ar-Rahman in Fedis, he then fled to the Somali tribe of Bersub. In the end, ʽAbd ar-Rahman was deposed and forty villages are listed as having been destroyed by the Oromo to the north, west and south of Harar during the civil war. Harar became the home of numerous Somali scholars who came to the city to study the most notable being Sheikh Madar founder of Hargeisa. According to information gathered from the locals about the emirate in 1843, British Capt. S.B. Hanes asserts Harar lies within a couple days of Habash. Until the 1840s, the balance between Oromo and Somali influence led Harar to significantly expand economically, developing ties with Sharmarke Ali Saleh on the Somali coast. During this period slaves of Sidama and Gurage stock were important commodities exported to the coast. However, at the end of Abu Bakr II ibn ʽAbd al-Munan's reign in 1852, the Oromo once again attacked Harar, possibly due to drought. Abu Bakr was forced to pay tribute to the Oromo, which led to an economic crisis and a devaluation in the Harari currency. During the reign of Ahmad III ibn Abu Bakr, Harar was once more besieged by the Oromo for 18 months until Ahmad III agreed to let the Oromo merchants enter the town with their weapons. When Ahmad III died without an heir to his throne, the Oromo helped place Muhammad ibn 'Ali 'Abd ash-Shakur in power.

Around this time, Harar was visited by the famous British traveler Richard Francis Burton, he describes Harar during his visit in 1855:

"The ancient metropolis of a once mighty race, the only permanent settlement in Eastern Africa, the reported seat of Moslem learning, a walled city of stone houses, possessing its independent chief, its peculiar population, its unknown language, and its own coinage, the emporium of the coffee trade, the head-quarters of slavery, the birth-place of the Chat plant"

Muhammad is said to have oppressed his own people by devaluing the city's currency while extracting a special mahalaq al-Oromo or Oromo tax. This tax was needed for Emir Muhammad to meet the demands of hospitality inherent in the status of ilman gosa. Richard Pankhurst also notes that Emir Muhammad forbade his subjects from eating rice or dates, "declaring that they were suitable only for rulers." However, Caulk points that Muhammad engaged in a new policy: instead of simply keeping the Oromo at bay, he "made systematic efforts to convert them to Islam and extend their involvement in commercial agriculture; he thereby attempted to assimilate more of the Oromo and re-establish the balance on which the town's survival depended." Until the 1830s, only the Babile Oromo and groups of mixed Oromo-Somali ethnicity had been converted to Islam to any degree. Nonetheless, Muhammad lack the power to make much headway in this endeavor, and it was only after the Egyptian conquest that this policy made major strides.

==== Anglo-Egyptian occupation (19th century) ====
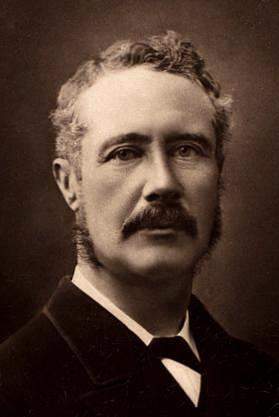
British administrator Charles Gordon who visited Harar during the Anglo-Egyptian occupation

Due to the oppressive emir in Harar the Harari opposition requested Egypt intervene to liberate the people in the region. In October 1878, Muhammad Rauf Pasha led a well armed Egyptian force of 1,200 men into the interior of eastern Ethiopia and without encountering any opposition, seized Harar on 11 October 1875. A few days later, Emir Muhammad was murdered by an Egyptian bashi-bazouk while leading evening prayers, his relatives then fled to the countryside to seek refuge among the neighboring Oromos.

The Egyptians spent much of their time establishing their authority over the surrounding Oromo to secure the caravan routes and attempt the agricultural exploitation of Harar's hinterlands. Rauf Pasha conducted brutal expeditions in the countryside from February to March 1876. Despite this, the Egyptians were never able to pacify the Oromos, and effective Egyptian control rarely reached further than 40 miles away from the city. To strengthen their tenuous control of Harar, the Khedive increased its garrison to 160 officials, 3,411 soldiers and 5,000 of their wives and children. This garrison represented a fifth of Harar's entire population, and the soldiers were usually quartered among the local populace. The imposition of substantial taxes in Harar incited protests from the Harari people against the Egyptian occupation, prompting British administrator Charles George Gordon to intervene in 1884 to remove Governor Rauf Pasha from his position. Researcher Alice Moore-Harell indicates that before Gordon's arrival, the atmosphere had grown strained, with certain Egyptian soldiers aligning themselves with the local populace and declining to follow the governor's directives.

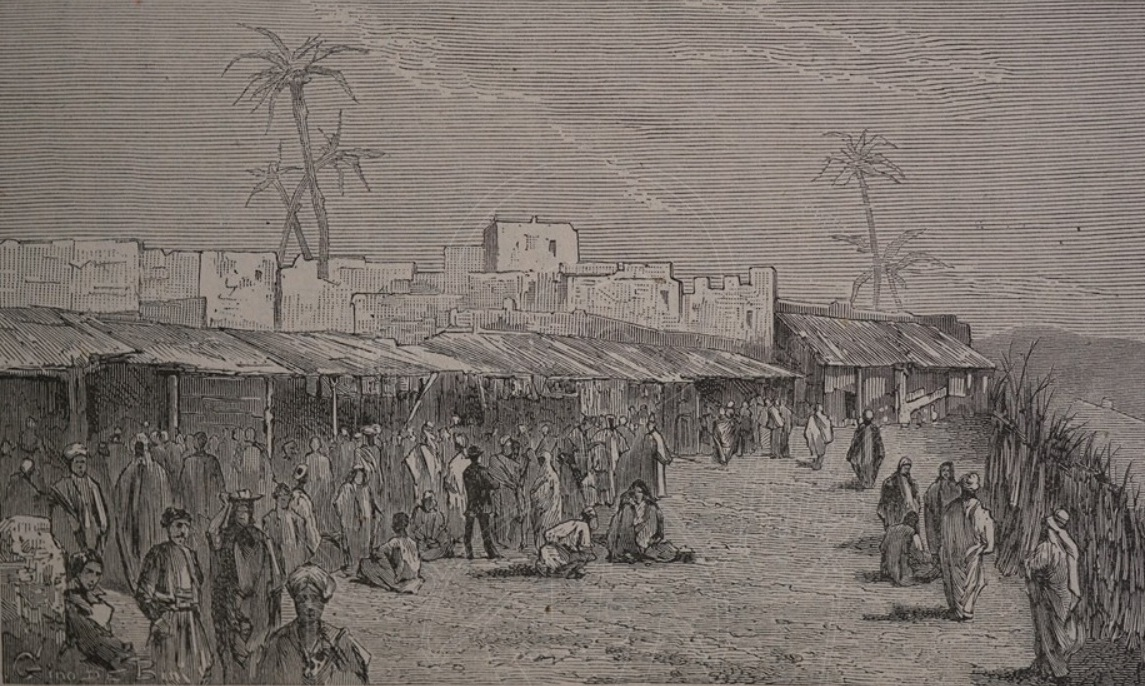
Market of Harar city in the nineteenth century by Antonio Cecchi

British army officer John Hunter describes Harari attitudes towards the Egyptians in 1884:

The people of Harar have relatively high intelligence and are permeated with Muslim fanaticism, despite their submission and disarmament . . . the Egyptians are not viewed by them as pure from a religious standpoint. The pashas are lukewarm believers in the Prophet.

The Egyptian period witnessed the reconstruction and enlargement of the city's infrastructure. Under the governor Nadi Pasha, the height of the walls were increased. The old palace of the Emirs was demolished and erected in its place was a two-story governor's house which looked over the marketplace and dominated the entire settlement. The town's main mosque was also torn down and replaced with a somewhat larger structure. The Egyptians also built a much needed hospital near the south western gate under Ridwan Pasha. During the period of Egyptian rule, Arthur Rimbaud lived in the city as the local functionary of several different commercial companies based in Aden; he returned in 1888 to resume trading in coffee, musk, and skins until a fatal disease forced him to return to France. A house said to have been his residence is now a museum.

The Egyptian occupation of Harar came to an end as a result of the British conquest of Egypt and the Mahdist revolt. These developments produced a crisis in 1884 when the Egyptian government's payments to the troops ceased to arrive, the garrison was forced to raid the Oromos and Somalis for food. In accordance with an agreement with another power in the region namely France, the UK was forced to withdraw its Egyptian forces from Harar. The Egyptian troops duly moved out of the city, taking some valuables with them, but leaving most of their local families behind. The Emirate was thus restored under Emir Abdullahi in 1885, however Emir Abdullahi's rule was short lived for in 1887 Menelik II would defeat him at the Battle of Chelenqo and thus conquer the walled city.

=== Ethiopian rule (20th century) ===
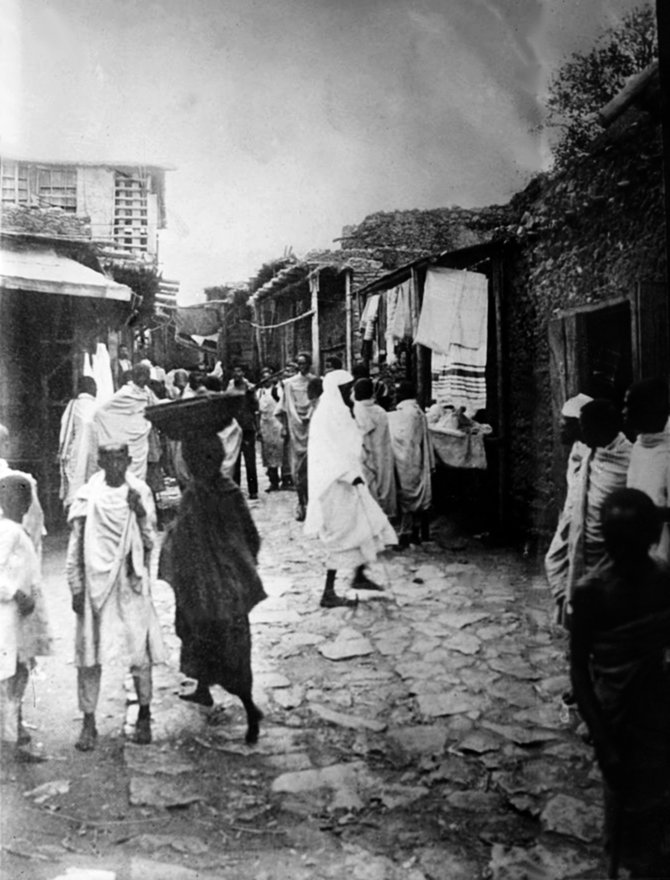
The street market of Harar, 1900

In 1887, the army of Menelik II would conquer Harar after defeating Emir Abdullahi's troops at Chelenqo, then appointed his nephew Ras Makonnen as governor of the region. According to Jules Borelli, after Menelik's departure many of the Shewan troops quartered in the city were said to have looted the silos in which the inhabitants had stored their grain. Some of those robbed appealed to Makonnen, who promised restitution, but Borelli believes they never received any. Makonnen had ordered the primary mosque of Harar torn down and replaced it with an Orthodox Church designed by an Italian architect. The French traveler Charles Michel notes that "the first years of the Abyssinian occupation were far from prosperous" as "the Abyssinian chiefs took for themselves what could have any value", while "the soldiers, several thousand in number, chased the Hararis from their dwellings to install themselves in their place, and devastated everything around them." Traders were driven away and markets becoming impossible in towns were held instead in the remote countryside.

Harar lost some of its commercial importance with the creation of the French-built Addis Ababa–Djibouti Railway, initially intended to run via the city but diverted north of the mountains between Harar and the Awash River to save money. As a result of this, Dire Dawa was founded in 1902 as New Harar. The British planned to revitalise the historic Harar-Berbera trade route by connecting the two cities via rail as a means to bolster trade. However, the initiative was vetoed by parliament on the grounds that it would harm the Entente Cordiale between France and Britain.

Unlike with most other subjugated lands in the south, Harar's pre-conquest government employed literacy as a tool of governance. Therefore, Ras Makonnen did not attempt to destroy them, but choose to inherit the long established administrative structures and official archives. The retention of historically developed administrative structure was an attempt to govern the province as inexpensively as possible. Nevertheless, with the arrival of settlers from Shewa into the region social tensions ensured, especially when Harar came to be regarded as the support base for Lij Iyasu. By the 1920s, the previously dominate position held by Hararis was beginning to be replaced by Christian immigrants, who extended their land holdings in the city by granting the Hararis large and unpayable loans. To stem the tide of land confiscations, a group of Harari elites established a group called the firmac. The goal of the firmac was to protect Harari property and maintain ethnic unity by discouraging un-Islamic practices. They also opened the first Islamic school in Harar that taught modern subjects.

==== Italian occupation and aftermath (1936–1948) ====
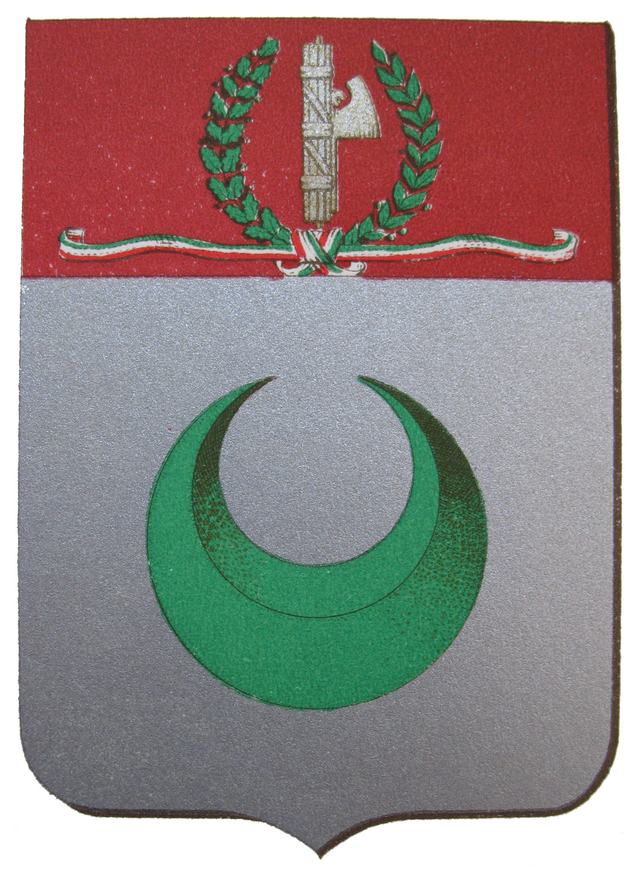
Harar province coat of arms during Italian rule

Harar was captured by the 29th Infantry Division "Piemonte" on 8 May 1936 under Marshal Rodolfo Graziani during the Second Italo-Ethiopian War. The Italian invasion of Ethiopia was generally welcomed by Harar, who had grown to resent the Christian Amhara rule, the Italian policy of pitting different ethnic and religious groups had resonated with the Hararis. Under the Italians, mosques were built, the use of Arabic was encouraged, Hararis and other Muslim collaborators were hired by the Italian administration and previously confiscated land was returned to their original owners and descendants. Harar would serve as the capital of Harar Governorate, one of the Italian governors of Harar was Enrico Cerulli (1939–1940).

During the East African Campaign, Italian rule would almost immediately disintegrate and Harar was captured by the 1st battalion of the Nigeria Regiment, advancing from Jijiga by way of the Marda Pass on 29 March 1941. The freedom granted to Harar by the Italians was not quickly forgotten, especially after Emperor Haile Selassie attempted to restore the political and economic power of the Shewan elites. When the Somali Youth League (SYL) began agitating Harari members, they started their own branch known as Kulubi. The Ethiopian government immediately cracked down on this movement, arresting suspected members, confiscating property and imposing travel restrictions. This had a significant effect as for the first time in history, Hararis began migrating out of the city in large numbers, mainly to Dire Dawa and Addis Ababa, but also eventually abroad to Europe and North America, creating a large Harari diaspora.

==== Present (1948–) ====
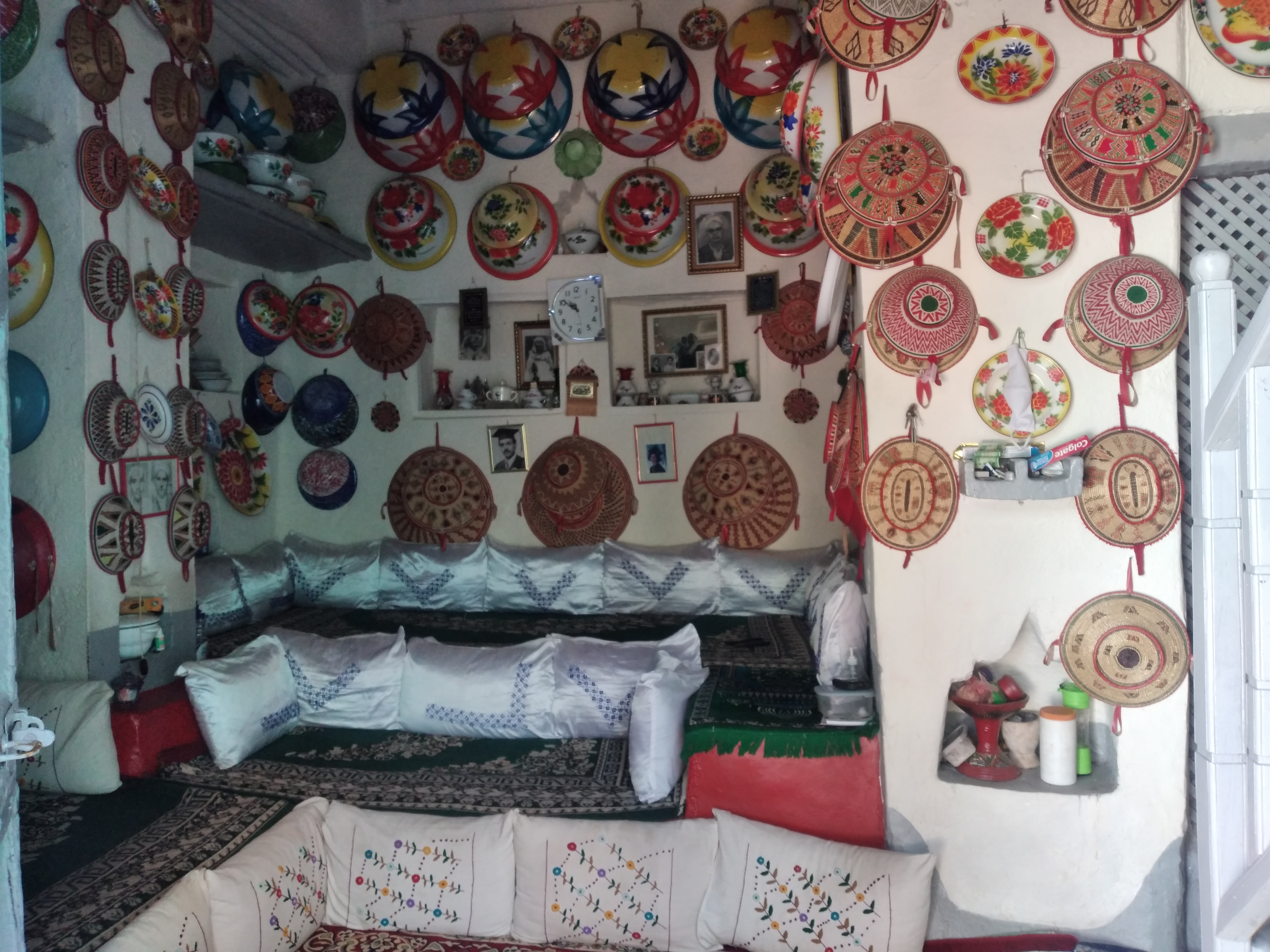
The Harari Cultural House (Gey Gar)

Following the aftermath of World War II, the city saw the construction of a high school and a military academy. With the rise of the Derg in the 1970s, Harari disatsifcation remained high, Derg officials appropriating Harari property and forcibly conscripting Harari youth into the army saw further migration abroad, specifically to Canada and the United States.

After the rise of the Ethiopian People's Revolutionary Democratic Front (EPRDF) in the early 1990s, Hararis were encouraged to use their language in official capacities. Considerable effort was taken to develop Harari as an official educational and administrative language. This saw a general cultural revival in Harar, with also stressed the importance of Islam. The complex social interactions of Sufi rituals at Harar's numerous shrines both refined local Islamic identity and attracted large numbers of Muslim Ethiopian tourists. By 1994, two political parties were vying over power in Harar, one being the Harari National League (HNL) and the Harari Democratic Unity Party. After a tense competition which occasionally descended into violence, the HNL was able to seize power.

Tensions persist between the Harari people and the neighboring Oromo community, as the Oromo have taken possession of certain agricultural lands belonging to the Harari in the area surrounding Harar. In 2018, Tom Gardner reported that the Qeerroo Oromo nationalists took control of the city, demanding millions of Ethiopian birr as a condition for restoring water supplies to the residents of Harar. A significant upheaval has emerged due to the increasing encroachment of Oromia, which is demanding a greater influence over the government of Harar.

== Culture ==
According to Sir Richard Burton Harar is the birthplace of the khat plant. The original domesticated coffee plant is also said to have been from Harar.

== Climate ==
The climate of Harar is classified as subtropical highland climate (Cwb) in Köppen-Geiger climate classification system.

Throughout the year, afternoon temperatures are warm to very warm, whilst mornings are cool to mild. Rain falls between March and October with a peak in August, whilst November to February is usually dry.

Climate data for Harar, elevation 1,856 m (6,089 ft)
Month	Jan	Feb	Mar	Apr	May	Jun	Jul	Aug	Sep	Oct	Nov	Dec	Year
Mean daily maximum °C (°F)	25.4 (77.7)	26.5 (79.7)	26.9 (80.4)	25.8 (78.4)	25.6 (78.1)	24.7 (76.5)	24.0 (75.2)	24.0 (75.2)	24.6 (76.3)	25.6 (78.1)	25.5 (77.9)	24.7 (76.5)	25.3 (77.5)
Mean daily minimum °C (°F)	12.3 (54.1)	12.7 (54.9)	13.8 (56.8)	13.9 (57.0)	13.7 (56.7)	13.7 (56.7)	13.4 (56.1)	13.3 (55.9)	13.1 (55.6)	12.4 (54.3)	12.1 (53.8)	12.1 (53.8)	13.0 (55.5)
Average precipitation mm (inches)	15.4 (0.61)	13.8 (0.54)	66.8 (2.63)	119.7 (4.71)	108.6 (4.28)	62.8 (2.47)	119.1 (4.69)	122.1 (4.81)	119.7 (4.71)	53.1 (2.09)	16.8 (0.66)	11.8 (0.46)	829.7 (32.66)
Average relative humidity (%)	54	54	64	56	60	65	75	67	66	54	49	52	60
Source 1: Ethiopian Meteorological Institute
Source 2: FAO (humidity)

== Demographics ==
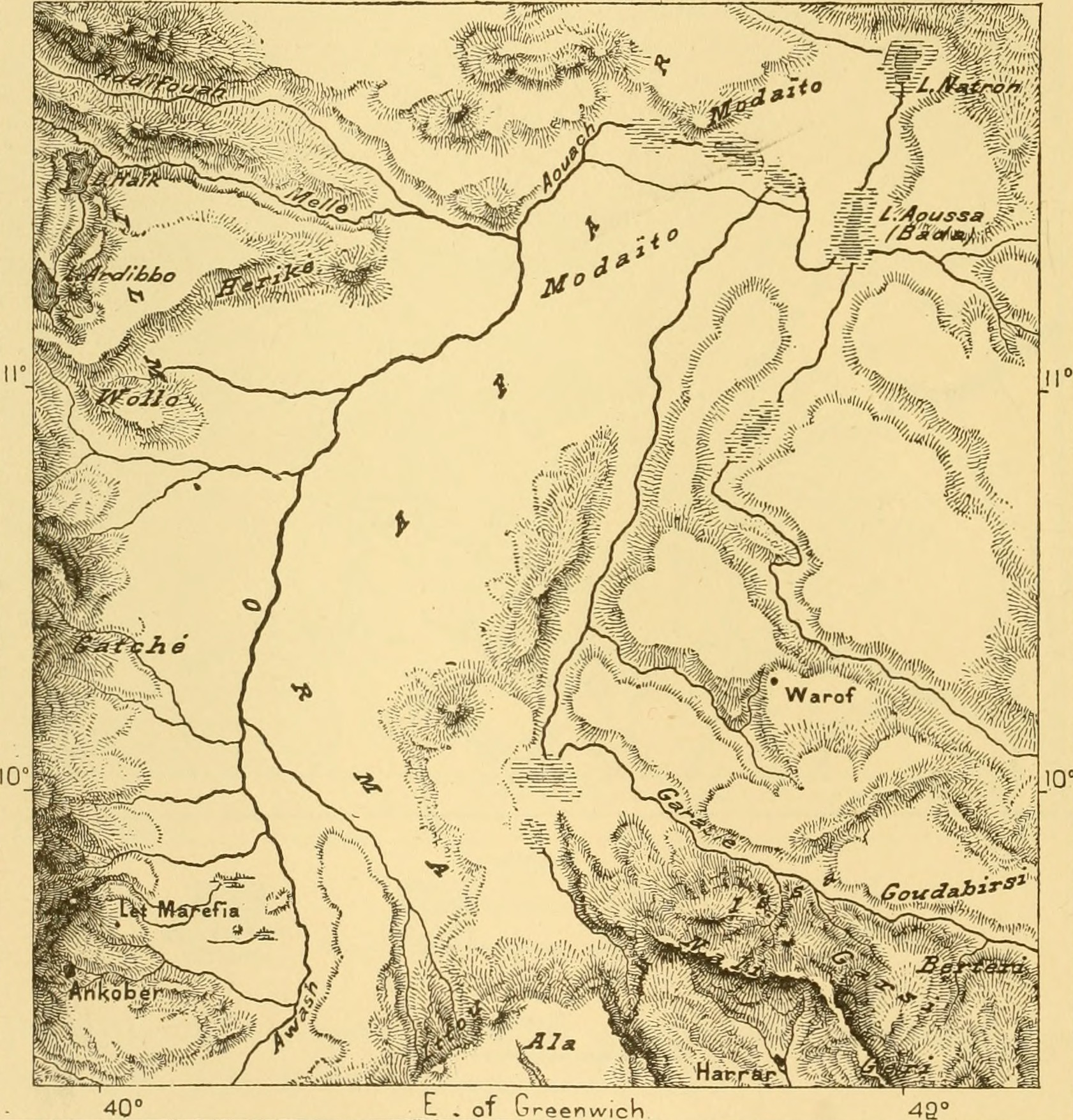
An old map of Harar featuring the Gadabuursi, Geri, Issa, Karanle Hawiye and Berteri Jidwaaq Somali communities.

Based on the 2007 national census conducted by the Central Statistical Agency of Ethiopia (CSA), Harar city had a total urban population of 99,368, of whom 49,727 were men and 49,641 women. The six largest ethnic groups reported in Harar were the Amhara (40.55%), the Oromo (28.14%), the Harari (11.83%), the Gurage (2.94%), the Somali (6.82%), and the Tigrayans (2.76%); all other ethnic groups together comprised less than 2% of the population. Amharic was spoken as a first language by 49.2% of city inhabitants, Oromo by 23.7%, Harari by 12.2%, and Somali by 6.6%. The plurality of urban inhabitants professed Islam, with 48.54% of the population having reported they practiced that belief, while 44.56% of the population said they were Christian, and 6.14% were Protestant.

=== Ethnicity ===
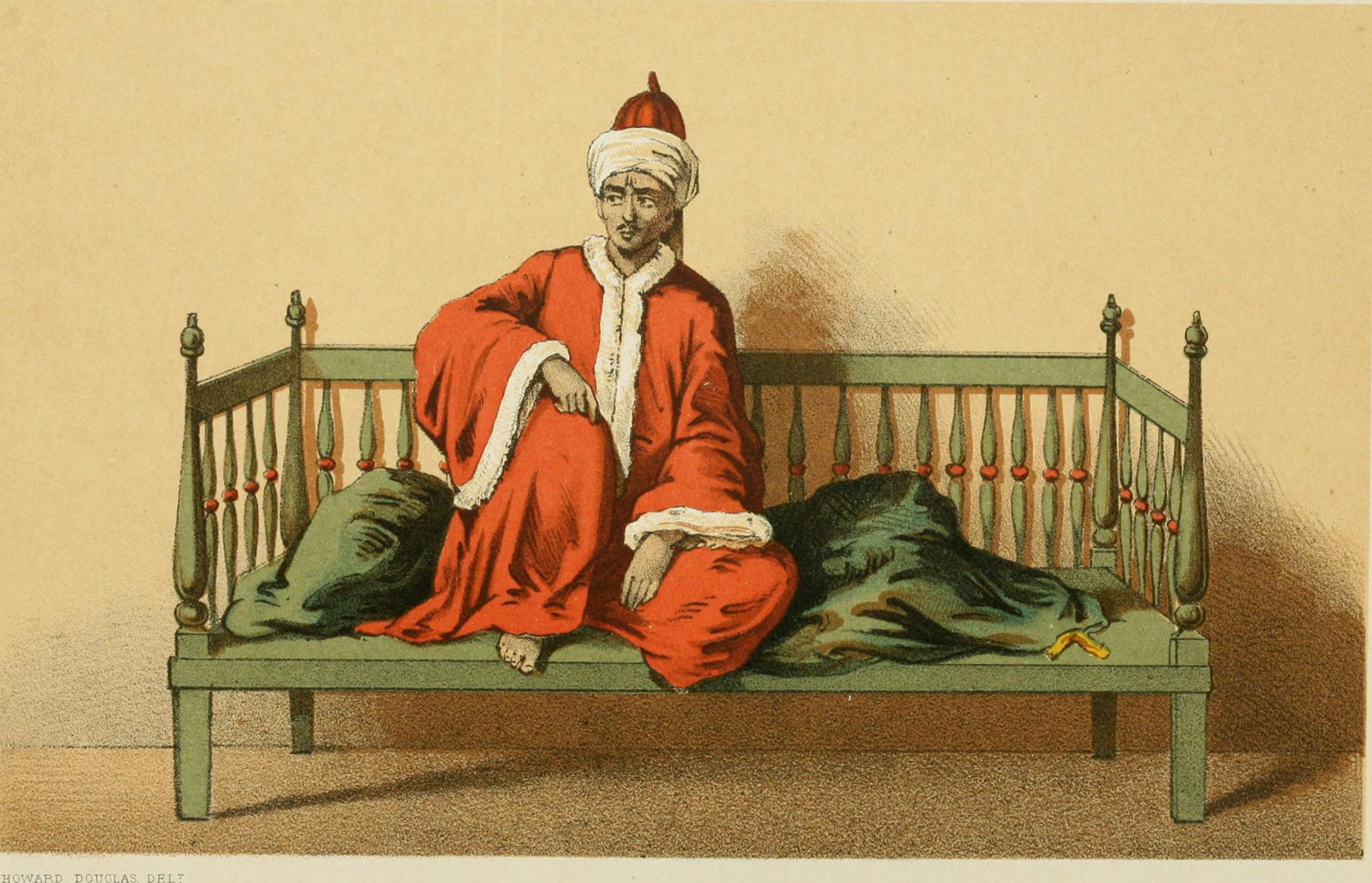
H. H. Ahmad Bin Abu Bakr, Emir of Harar.

Barker Haines reported in 1840 that the majority of the population of Harar were Hararis however a few Oromo, Afar, Somali and Arabian traders of Yemen were also present. In 1855 Richard Francis Burton described Harar as having an approximately 8,000 inhabitants; 3,000 Somali Bedouins (referring to seasonal nomads who "come and go"), 2,500 Hararis, and 2,500 Somalis. Burton further reported a large Oromo presence leading to the town. During his visit in the Khedivate of Egypt occupation of the Emirate of Harar, researcher Paultischke describes Harar as having roughly 40,000 inhabitants with 25,000 of these being Hararis, 6,000 Oromo, 5,000 Somalis, as well as a minority of Europeans and Asians. Paultischke further noted that there were 3000 Abyssinians, who, according to historian Abdurahman Garad, referred to the Argobba traders of Ifat, per the emirate's documents.

After the conquest of the Emirate of Harar by the Ethiopian Empire, an influx of Amhara settled in Harar and its surroundings. In 1887, French explorer Jules Borelli reported half the population fled the city following the Abyssinian conquest. According to British diplomat Christopher Addison, the city in the early 1900s, consisted of Indians, Somalis, Oromo, Abyssinians and the Harari who made up the majority. The Somali population of the town was decimated following the overthrow of Lij Iyasu by Abyssinian militias. The indigenous Harari natives who once were majority within the walled city are under 15%, due to ethnic cleansing by the Haile Selassie regime. As a result of the repression by the Ethiopian regime, in the late 1970s Hararis residing in Addis Ababa outnumbered those in Harar. According to Feener, the Harari have not recovered from the 1948 state-led crackdown on their population.

The Somali tribes surrounding Harar are mainly from the Gadabuursi and Issa subclans of the Dir and the Karanle subclan of the Hawiye. They represent the most native Somali clans in the region. The Darod clans of the Geri and Jidwaaq also inhabit areas near Harar. The Gadabuursi and Geri Somali strike immediately north and north eastwards of the town. Richard Francis Burton (1856) describes the Gadabuursi and Geri Somali clans as extending to within sight of Harar and the Habr Awal were also extended from Berbera to Harar..The Issa and Karanle Hawiye strike north and north westwards whilst the Jidwaaq strike eastwards.

I.M. Lewis (1998) states:

"Including the land round Harar and Dire Dawa inhabited by the Somalis of the 'Iise and Gadabuursi clans."

== City layout ==
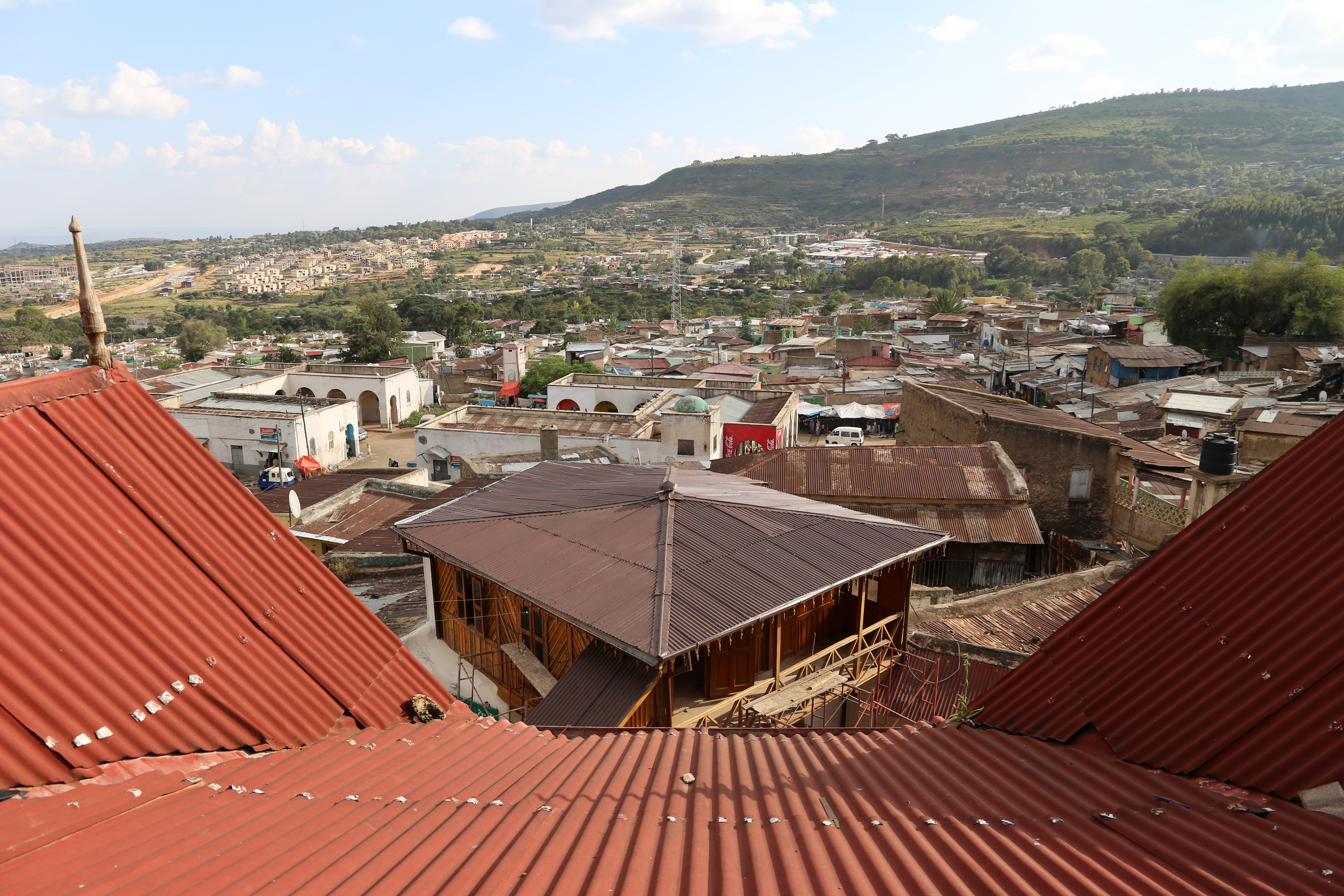
View of Harar Jugol, the Fortified Historic Town (a UNESCO World Heritage Site).

The old walled city of Harar is divided into 5 quarters: Argobba Bari, Assum Bari, Badro Bari, Suqutat Bari, and Asmadin Bari. These quarters are then further divided into neighborhoods called toya, which are often named after a Muslim shrine or a prominent tree serving as a local landmark. According to S.R. Waldron, there were 59 such neighborhoods around 1975.

In the late 1960s, it was still possible to walk around the outside of the city walls on foot; doing so took about an hour. By the early 1980s, though, this was no longer possible because the city had begun to expand out from the walled city, with some buildings being built directly attached to the outside of the wall.

=== Walls and gates of Harar ===
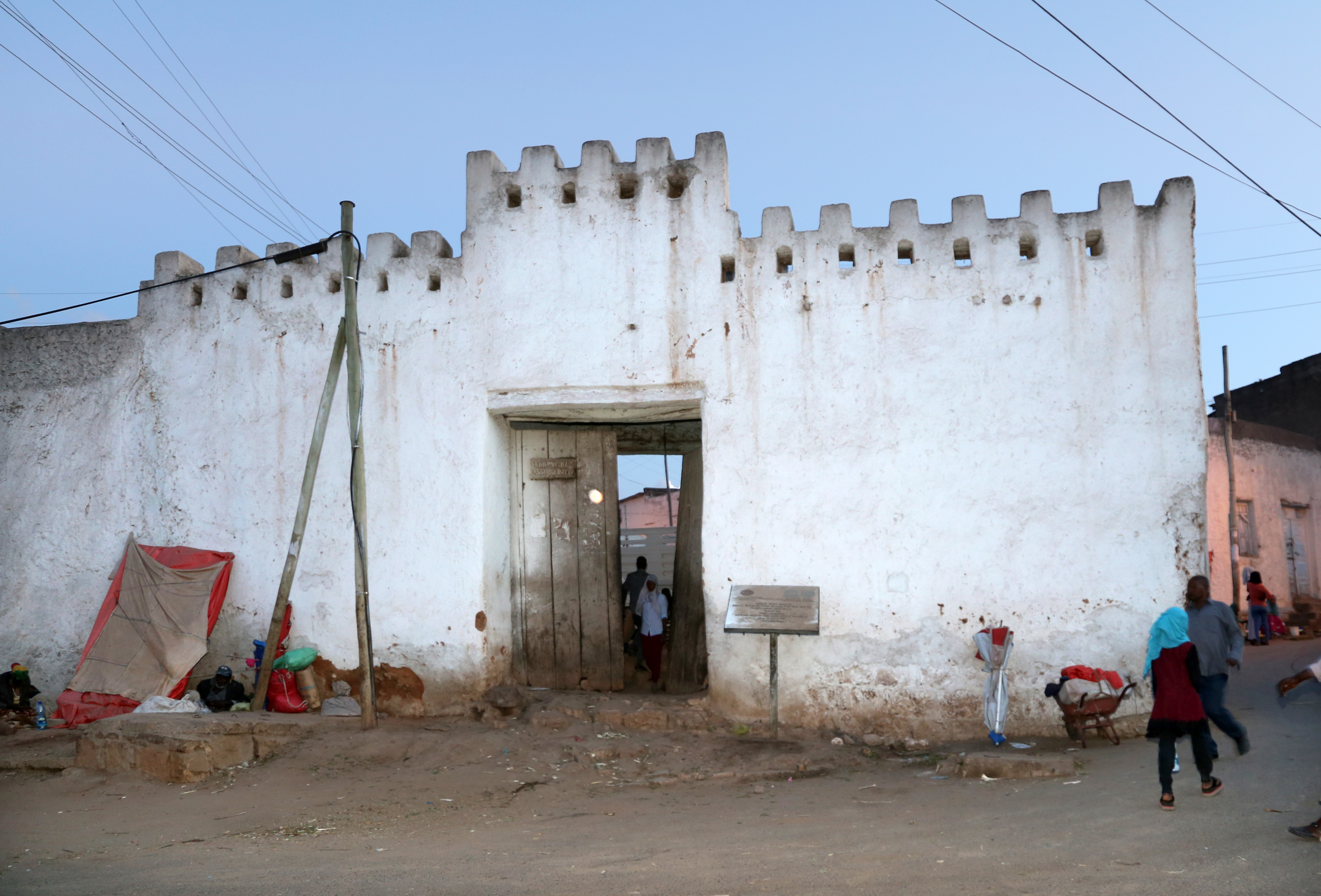
Suqutat Bari gate

The Old City of Harar with an approximate area of 60 hectares (150 acres) is surrounded by ramparts on the northern and eastern sides and part of the southern side. There are five ancient city gates, These are, clockwise from the north of the citadel:

- Assum Bari (located in the north)
- Argobba Bari (located in the east)
- Suqutat Bari (located in the south east)
- Badro Bari (located in the south)
- Asmadin Bari (located in the west)

Other gates such as the unofficial modern sixth "Harar gate" was built after the Abyssinian invasion in the 19th century.

== Houses ==
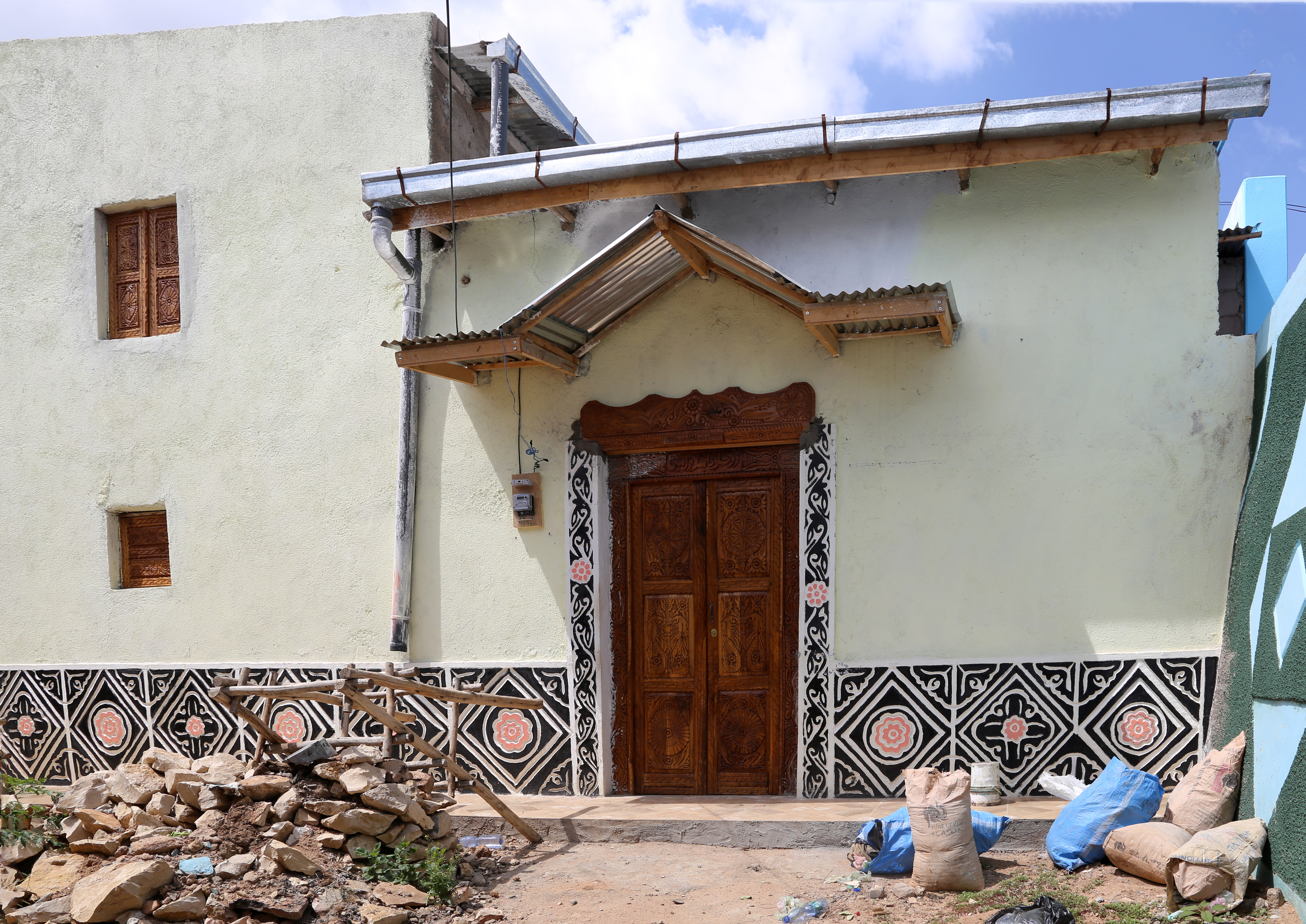
Exterior of a Harari house

Known as gey gar ("city house", plural: gey garach), Harari houses form a distinct archetype that differs from other Muslim regions and from other parts of Ethiopia. The unmistakable layout of Harari houses dates back to 1754 under the reign Emīr Yūsuf Abūbakar. The traditional Harari house design is still widely in use today, with only minor changes, and Hararis who have moved to other cities try to adhere to a similar style. Hararis take great pride in their houses, and they form an important part of Harari culture.

A walled compound (abāt) consists of several residences, which share the same walls but are not interconnected. They are arranged around a courtyard, with most of the windows facing the courtyard instead of the street. Doors to individual residences almost always point east or west; north- or south-facing doors are rare. According to Kabir Abdulmuheimen Abdulnassir, farmers and merchants often have east-facing doors so that they can rise early for work. The several families who live in the same compound share one or two kitchens, which are disconnected from the residences. The walls that surround the compounds are joined so that they are basically continuous. The outer gate facing the street is usually wooden but sometimes iron, and they are either painted or whitewashed. The walls form an architrave around them.

Sometimes several compounds are joined into a "block" of compounds, all surrounded by the same wall and then having their own walls around them. These "blocks" are set up so that a visitor passes the first compound before reaching the second, etc.

Building materials are local stone, while a mixture of pounded stones and clay are used as both mortar and plaster to cover the walls before they are whitewashed. This is the case in newer houses as well as older ones.

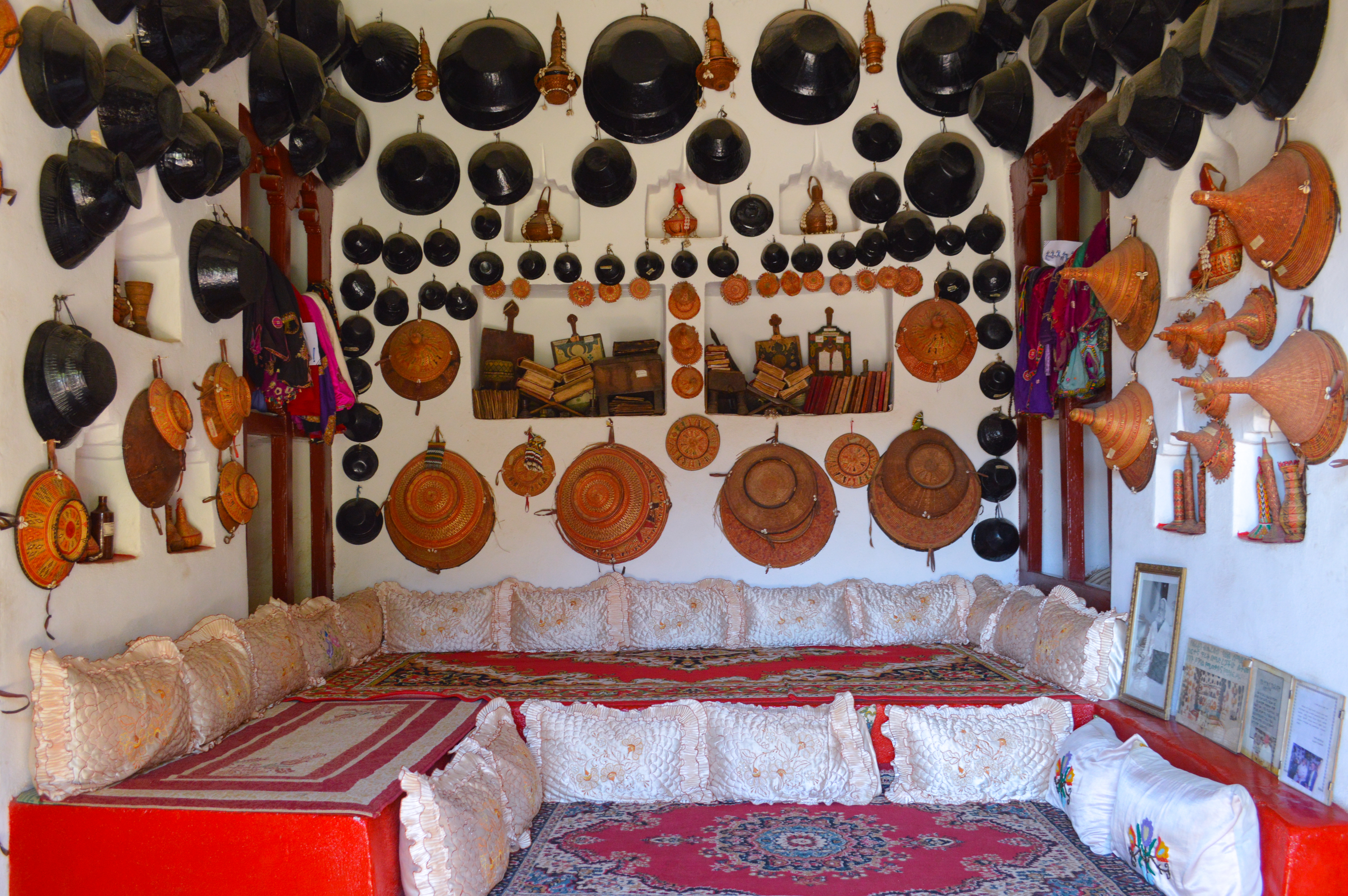
Interior of a Harari house

The floor plan of a typical Harari house is rectangular. The main room is the large living room called the gidīr gār or the gār ēqäd. The gidīr gār has several raised platforms, called nädäbas, which function as seats or beds. A typical house will have five nädäbas. At the back of the gidir gar, across from the front door, are two nädäbas: the "small" one, or tīt nädäba, and then behind it the "big" one, or gidīr nädäba, which is somewhat higher up. These are the two largest nädäbas. Shoes may be worn as far as the tīt nädäba, but then they must be removed. The tīt nädäba is where younger people or people with less seniority sit. Children also sleep on this nädäba. Historically, at the emir's court, it served as the seat for plaintiffs or defendants. The gidīr nädäba seats elders and people who are considered more senior. Historically, at the emir's court, dignitaries were seated here. When a person dies, their body is kept on the gidīr nädäba before being buried as a sign of respect. A basin is dug in the gidīr nädäba and filled with water and used to wash the body, and then the basin is filled in again.

The amīr nädäba, or nädäba of honor, is reserved for the master of the house and for honored guests; it can be on either the left or the right depending on the house. It is positioned so that the head of the family can see whoever enters the home and act accordingly. The "hidden" nädäba, or the sutri nädäba, can also be on either side but is always behind a protruding pillar or maxazu. Historically, this is known as the "malassay nädäba" because the guards of the emir would sit here during meetings or court cases. The sutri nädäba is used for sleeping. It is also used as a seat where the husband rests when he comes home. Finally, there is the gäbti äḥer näbäda, or the one behind the entrance door. Like the amīr and sutri nädäbas, this one can be on either the left or the right. At the back corners there are sometimes built-in cupboards or wardrobes called näbäda dēras. Cash and important documents are kept in a chest in the näbäda dēra. The upper part of the näbäda dēra is used to store clothes belonging to the master of the house.

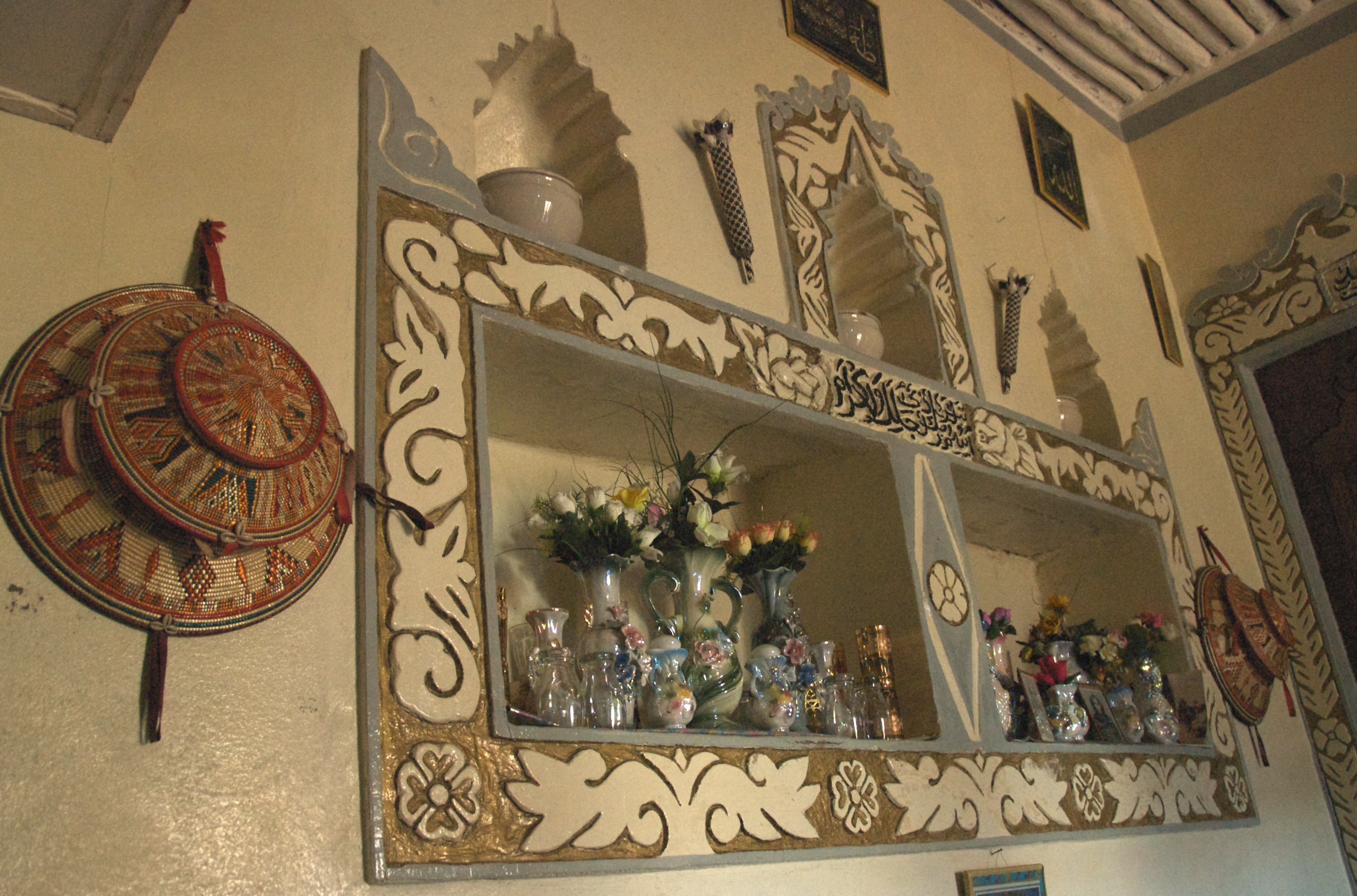
Wall niches in a Harari home

The gidīr gār has built-in niches called ṭāqēts which are used to store and display personal possessions. They are fairly high up and there are typically 11 of them: five on the main wall opposite the door, and the rest on the other walls. The two rectangular niches in the middle of the main wall (called ēqäd ṭāqēt) are typically used to store books, especially the Qur'an. Their rectangular shape is supposed to be evocative of death and the grave. In addition to the 11 main niches, there are sometimes also niches in the nädäbas, which are used to hold shoes or an incense burner.

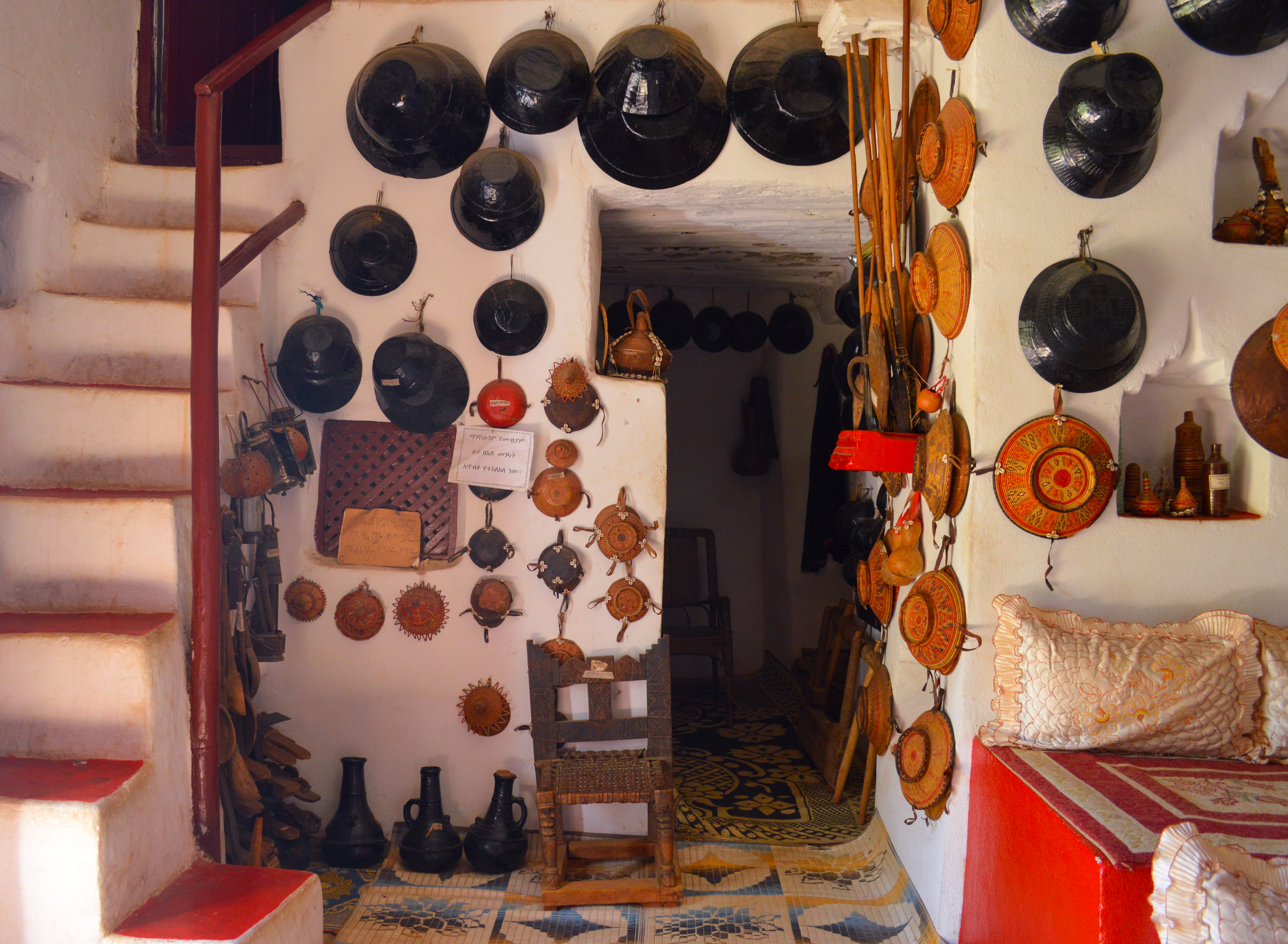
Stairway to the qala on the left, with the kirtät in the background

On either side of the entrance there is an open doorway leading to the kirtät, which is a side room with a low ceiling and its own nädäba. The wall between the kirtät and the gidīr gār sometimes has a window screen with decorative woodcarving. Women usually stay in the kirtät when men have a bärça (a meeting to chew khat and meditate). In the past, the kirtät was also where a young bride would live in seclusion for 8 months after her wedding. In that case the entryway to the kirtät, which does not otherwise have a door, would be covered with a bamboo screen and a curtain.

A second side room with a low ceiling, the dēra, is connected to the kirtät by a small door. It is used to store items which are not susceptible to attack by rats. Next to the door, the wall of the dēra has a special niche where the aflālas are kept. These are black pottery containers with long necks and covered by elongated basketry lids called aflāla uffas. They are used to store the family's jewelry and other valuables, as well as the umbilical cords of the family's children. According to Fethia Ahmed, curator of the Harari cultural museum, the lids being turned upside down indicates that the husband has died and that there is a widow living in the house.

The dēra is a private space, where a husband and wife may speak without their children listening. It is also used by children between the ages of 3 and 7 to eat during Ramadan out of public view, before they begin to fast all day long at age 7. The dēra is built with porous stone without cement to allow for better ventilation.

The ceiling above the gidīr gār rises to the full height of the house. Above the side rooms, though, there is an upper level called the qala. Originally, the qala was used mainly for storage and sometimes as a sleeping area, and it was not separated from the gidīr gār in any way. Since the late 19th century, though, there is usually a wooden screen separating the two, and the qala has basically become a distinct second floor, often with several rooms, although without nädäbas or other installations. The staircase to the qala usually consists of six to nine steps. In newer houses it has a carved wood banister but in older houses it did not.

House ceilings are traditionally made of thin tree trunks which have had their bark stripped off. Today the ceiling is whitewashed along with the rest of the house. One beam, located above the edge of the tīt nädäba, is called the ḥāmil; today it is used to hang a neon lamp from, but in the past people would hang an ostrich egg from it because it was believed that doing so would protect the house from lightning. Nowadays, the ceilings are made of varnished wooden planks, with the ḥāmil distinguished by its larger size and distinct shape.

Floors are traditionally made of red earth (called qēḥ afär), and the parts of nädäbas that aren't covered by rugs or mats are also painted red. Today they are often tiled, usually with at least some red present. The red is supposed to be reminiscent of the blood shed at the Battle of Chelenqo.

Some houses will have an adjoining tīt gār or "small house", which has a separate entrance and a nädäba of its own. The tīt gār is often unconnected to the main house. It is used by younger family members, or sometimes rented to tenants. Since the 20th century, some houses add another level above the tīt gār and connect it to the qala as well as giving it a separate entrance via a staircase on the outside of the house.

Each compound typically contained a separate room for a farmhand or servant, without nädäbas or side rooms. There would also be stables for cows and donkeys. There are also typically one or two "kitchen houses", unconnected to the houses, typically located on either sides of the courtyard. These kitchens have no windows, with smoke escaping through the door, so eventually the walls end up covered in soot. Shelves made from tree trunks are used to store kitchen utensils.

In the past, Harari houses would have little to no furniture. Since the 20th century, simple Western-style wooden chairs have proliferated, as well as metal bedsteads with kapok mattresses which are set up on the sutri nädäba.

Richard Francis Burton described the emir's home as the only building whose exterior was whitewashed, implying that most buildings were undecorated at the time of his visit in the 1800s. Most houses were similarly described as neither painted nor whitewashed as late as 1935. Today, though, Hararis typically whitewash their houses with a limestone mixture (called näçih afär) at least once and ideally twice a year, once before Ramadan and once again before the Aräfa festival. Household items and baskets are thoroughly cleaned at the same time. Today, instead of whitewashing, walls are sometimes painted using oil paints. This can be any color, although green is the most popular.

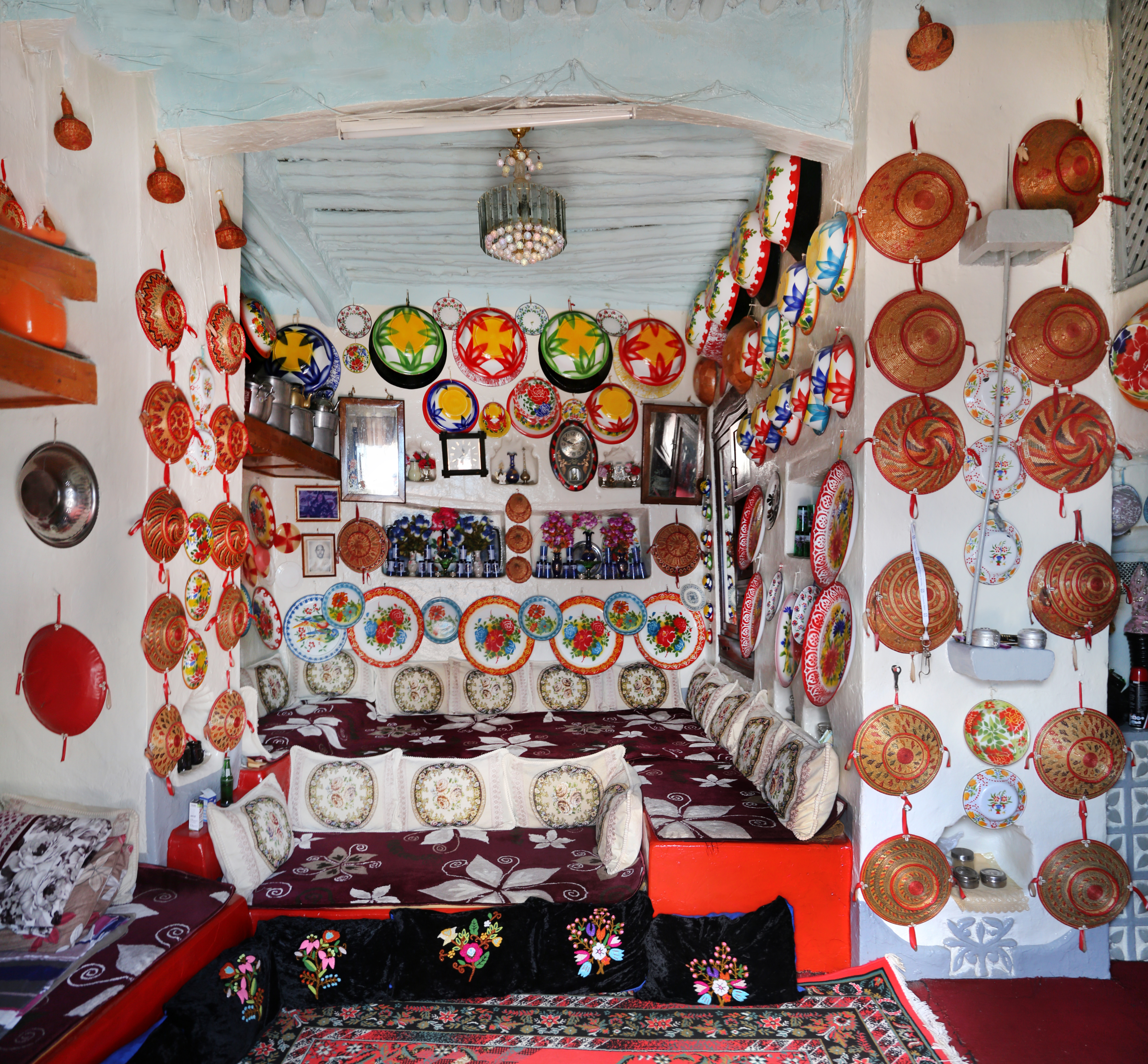
Hall in a traditional Harari house

Interior decorating of homes is typically done by women. They cover the nädäbas with rugs, mats, and pillows, and decorate the walls with Harari basketry (which is also typically made by women). Enamel plates and bowls are also hung on the walls today. Decorative baskets are generally hung up symmetrically and in pairs. Each household has its own style of decoration, and women guests often comment on how they like how the host's house is decorated. There is a stereotype that younger women are more fastidious at decorating their homes than older women, and that younger couples reapply the red earth to the floors once a week while older ones only do it a few times a year.

The largest type of decorative baskets are the kind that are used to serve bread and sweets at women's gatherings. These have tall conical lids that are hung above and overlapping them. They are hung in one or two rows on the wall behind the gidīr nädäba and below the niches, and they are typically in alternating pairs. Between the ēqäd ṭāqēts, the two rectangular niches in the center used for storing books, there is a vertical line of small basketry plates called sāgāris along with their lids. These are used to serve coffee beans at wedding or funeral feasts. They are typically in a group of 3, with 2 of them sharing a pattern and design. Next to the amīr nädäba and the dēra, the wall is decorated with other basketry plates in pairs. These are about the size of a breakfast plate and traditionally are used to serve bread. Two of them are called "the baskets for the mother-in-law", or the ḥamāt mot, and these are presented by the family of a bride to the in-laws at a wedding.

Emigrants from Harar often try to stick to the traditional Harari home layout when possible, even in buildings with different architectural styles. There will be some sort of gidīr gār indicated, with rugs and pillows forming an informal nädäba, and the walls will be decorated with traditional Harari basketry.

== Attractions ==
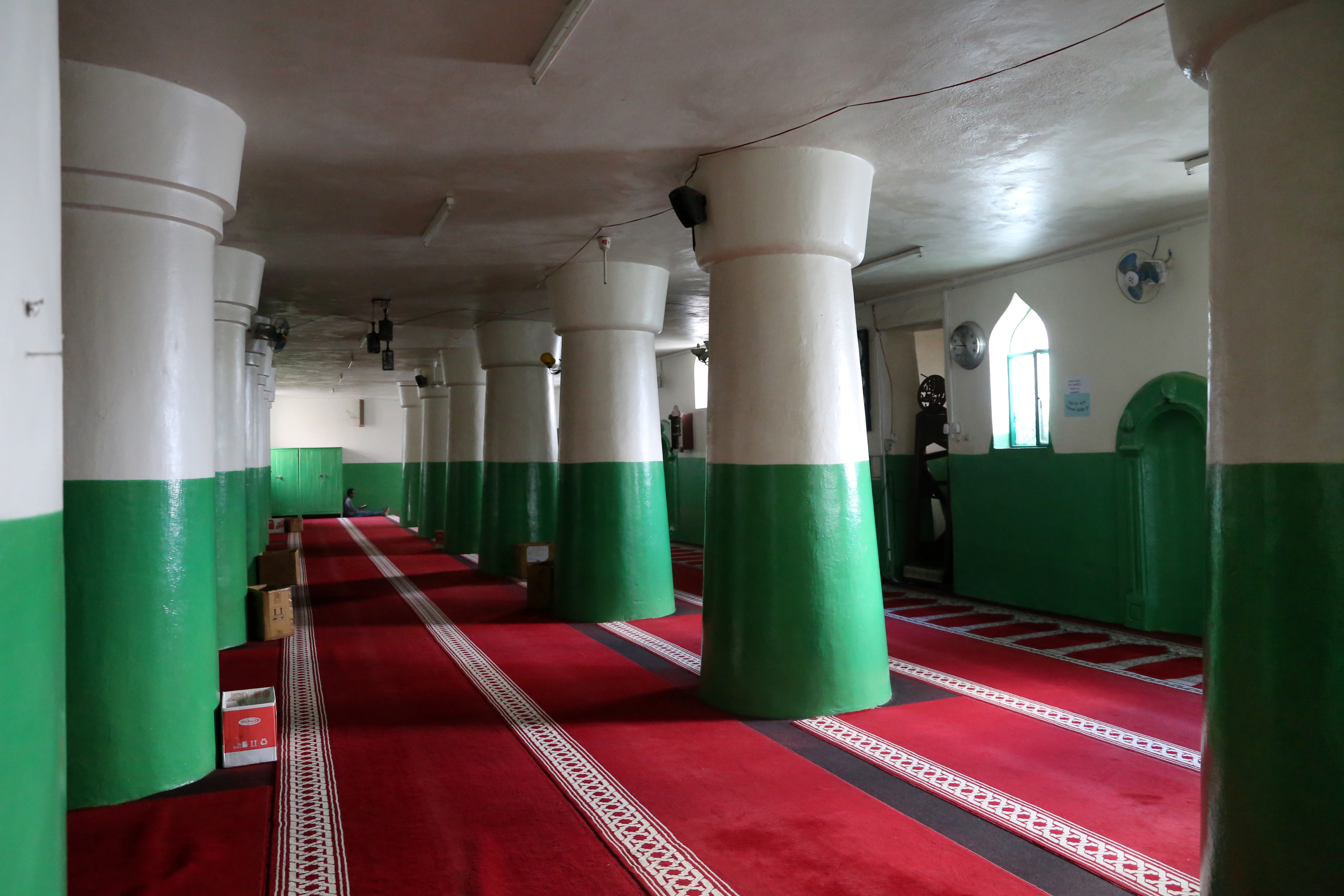
The Great Mosque of Harar

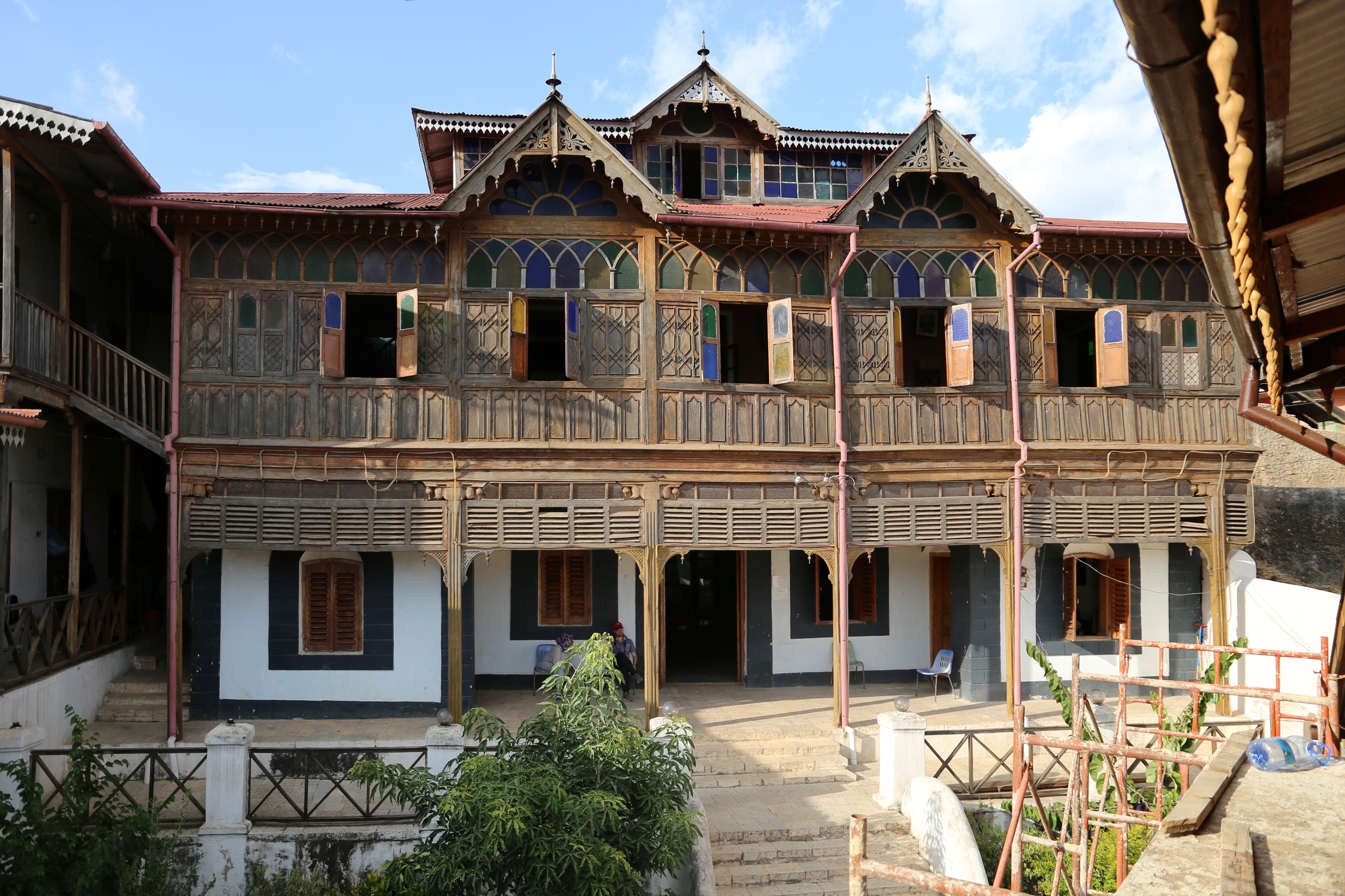
Arthur Rimbaud's house and museum

Besides the stone wall surrounding the city, the old town is home to 110 mosques and many more shrines, centered on Ferez Magala square. Notable buildings include Medhane Alem Cathedral, the house of Arthur Rimbaud, the 16th-century Jami Mosque and historic Great Five Gates of Harar. Harrar Bira Stadium is the home stadium for the Harrar Beer Bottling FC. One can also visit the market.

A long-standing tradition of feeding meat to spotted hyenas also evolved during the 1960s into an impressive night show for tourists. (See spotted hyenas in Harar.)

Other places of interest include the highest amba overlooking the city, the Kondudo or "W" mountain, which hosts an ancient population of feral horses. A 2008 scientific mission has unleashed efforts for their conservation, as the animals are greatly endangered.

The Harar Brewery was established in 1984. Its beers can be sampled at the brewery social club adjacent to the brewery in Harar.

Intercity bus service is provided by the Selam Bus Line Share Company.

=== Authenticity ===
Harar Jugol is a rare example of a relatively well preserved historic town that has retained its traditions, urban fabric, and rich Harari Muslim cultural heritage to the present time. It is one of the holy towns of Islam in Africa, and the capital of a minority region within Christian Ethiopia. The historic city is physically limited and well defined by its 16th-century surrounding wall and the setting has been retained along the eastern and south-eastern sides of the property. However, inappropriate interventions, such as plastering the houses, changing doors from wood to metal, the introduction of non-traditional materials and visual impacts such as TV antennas have been gradually affecting the authenticity of the historic fabric.

== Sister cities ==
Country	Town
France	Charleville-Mézières
United States	Clarkston
Djibouti	Arta
Turkey	Şanlıurfa

== Notable residents ==
- 'Abd Allah II ibn 'Ali 'Abd ash-Shakur, last emir of Harar
- Abadir Umar ar-Rida, legendary Muslim saint and founder of Harar
- Mahfuz, Imam and General of the Adal Sultanate
- Bati del Wambara, wife of Ahmad ibn Ibrahim al-Ghazi
- Nur ibn Mujahid, Emir of Harar
- Abdullah al-Harari, leader of al-Ahbash
- Malik Ambar, Leader of Ahmadnagar Sultanate
- `Ali ibn Da`ud, Founder of Emirate of Harar
- Hajji Abdullahi Ali Sadiq, businessman and Governor of Ogaden 1889–1914
- Arthur Rimbaud, the French poet, settled as a merchant in Harar between 1880 and 1891
- Abdullah Tahir, governor of Jigjiga
- Haile Selassie, Emperor of Ethiopia
- Ahmad ibn Ibrahim al-Ghazi, Leader of Adal Sultanate
- Sheikh Madar Shirwa, Somali Sheikh who founded Hargeisa
- Amha Selassie, Emperor of the Ethiopian Empire (Designate)
- Mohammed Hassen, Ethiopian historian
- Mohammed Ahmed, former CEO of Ethiopian Airlines

== See also ==
- Harari language
- Harari people
- East Hararghe
- West Hararghe
- Dire Dawa
- Harar Brewery
- Coffee production in Harar
- Hargeisa, a city in Somaliland also called "Little Harar"
- Islam in Ethiopia
  - Harar's significance in Islam
- Silt'e people, an ethnic claiming to originate from Harar
- List of World Heritage Sites in Ethiopia
