= Badro Bari =

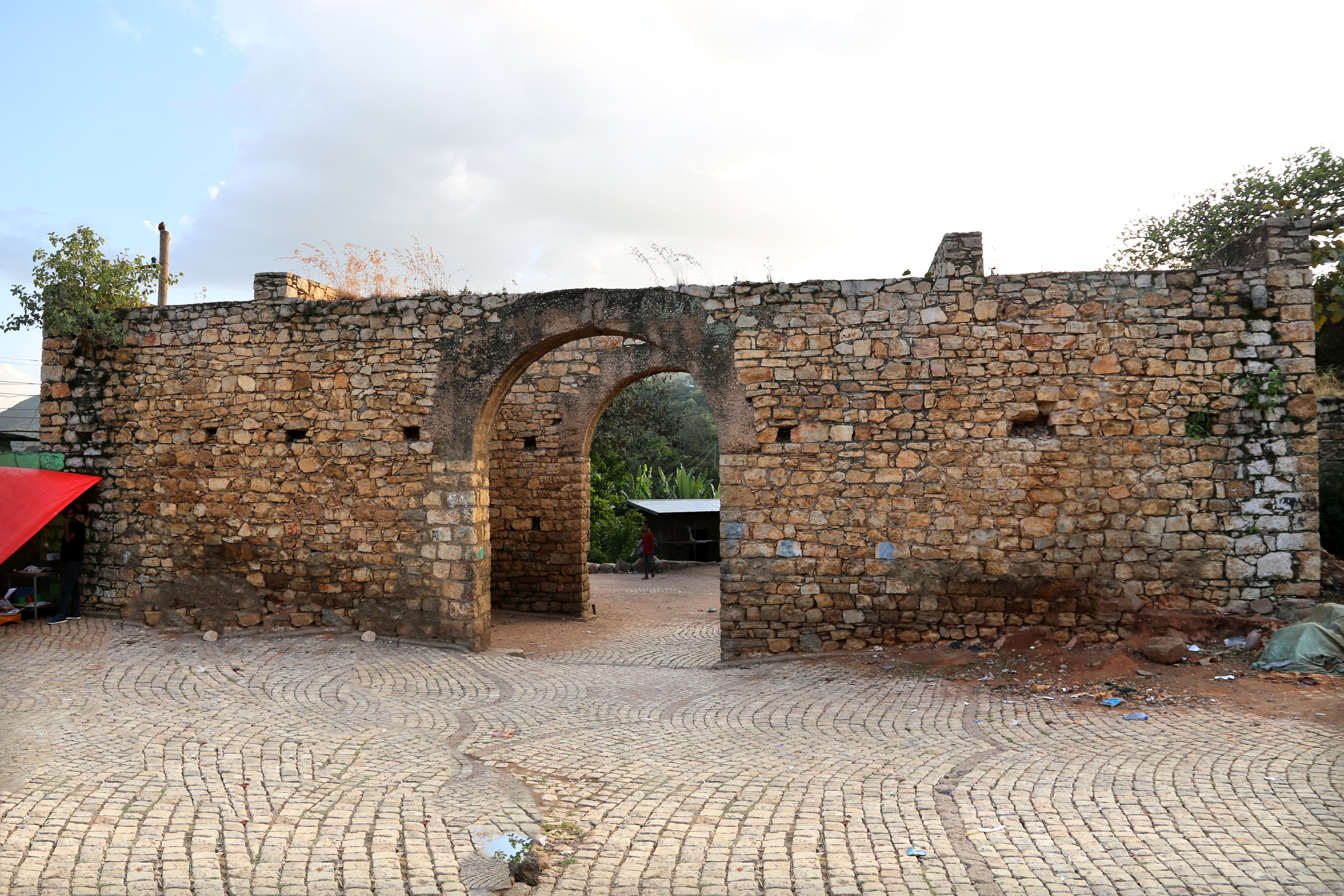
Badro Bari

Badro Bari, meaning "Badr gate" is one of five ancient gates of Harar, Ethiopia. It was named after the notable seventh century conflict in Islamic history called the Battle of Badr. The vicinity of the gate was the ground for the Malassay military drills for cadets.
