= Jamia Mosque, Harar =

Mosque in Harar, Ethiopia

Jamia Mosque
- مسجد الجامع
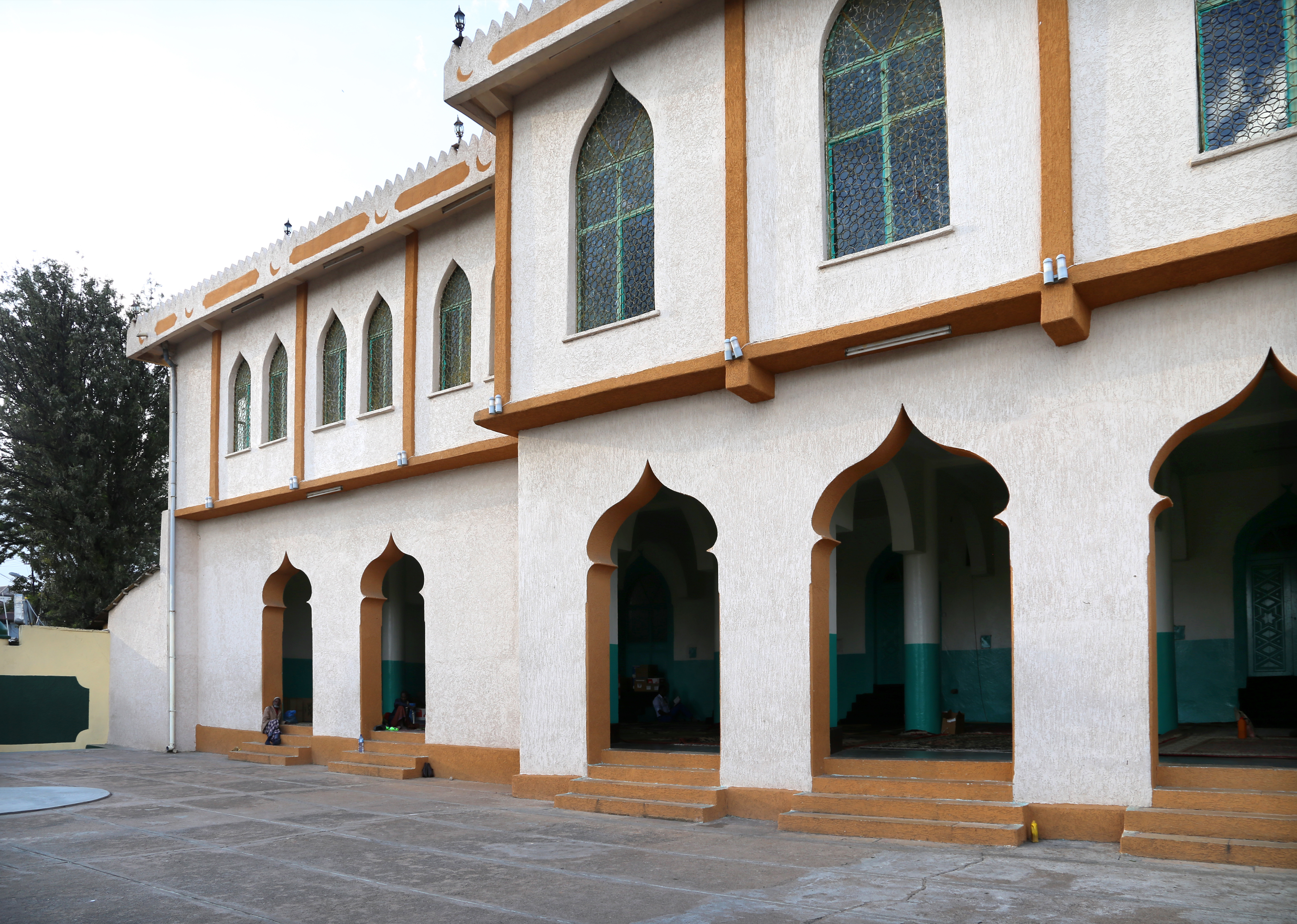

- Location of the mosque in Ethiopia

Religion
- Affiliation: Islam
- Ecclesiastical or organizational status: Friday mosque
- Status: Active

Location
- Location: 10 Amir Uga St, Harar
- Country: Ethiopia
- Interactive map of Jamia Mosque
- Coordinates: 9°18′40″N 42°08′20″E

Architecture
- Type: Mosque
- Completed: 1216 CE
- Minaret: 2

The Jamia Mosque (Arabic: مسجد الجامع, lit. 'Grand Mosque of Harar') is a Friday mosque in Harar, a city in eastern Ethiopia. It is located in the old walled city, the Harar Jugol, that is a UNESCO World Heritage Site.

== History ==
Local tradition suggests that the Jamia Mosque is one of the oldest mosque remaining in Harar, while others give it a foundation date of 1216 CE. Three Harar mosques have been dated from the 10th century CE, (Note: The three are Aw Mansur Mosque and Garad Muhammad Abogh Mosque within the Jugol, and Aw Machad Mosque outside.) although the Jamia Mosque was not dated. Archaeological excavation within the mosque perimeter has not been permitted.

The Jamia Mosque was extensively remodeled with the addition of a second minaret in the 16th century, probably during the reign of Ahmad ibn Ibrahim al-Ghazi (r. 1528–1543, whose gravestone is in the prayer hall. An inscription on the wooden minbar indicates that this was constructed in 1175 AH (1761/1762 CE).

In the early 19th century British diplomat William Cornwallis Harris described the Jamia Mosque:

The matin voice of the muezzin is regularly heard, and the Jama el Musjid is believed to be the abode of guardian angels, who stretch the strong pinion of protection over the heads of the Faithful. “How could Hurrur have triumphed thus long over the unbelievers,” inquire the devout citizens, “had Allah not extended his right arm to succour the followers of his Prophet?”

Under Amir Abdullahi (r. 1885–1887) the mosque was enlarged. During the Italian occupation (1936–1941) a water pool was added to the sahn on the east side of the mosque. The mosque was most remodelled in the 1980s, with the addition of a second storey.

== See also ==
- Islam in Ethiopia
- List of mosques in Ethiopia
- List of World Heritage Sites in Ethiopia
