= Harari people =

Semitic-speaking ethnic group in the Horn of Africa

Harari ሀረሪ / هَرَرِ
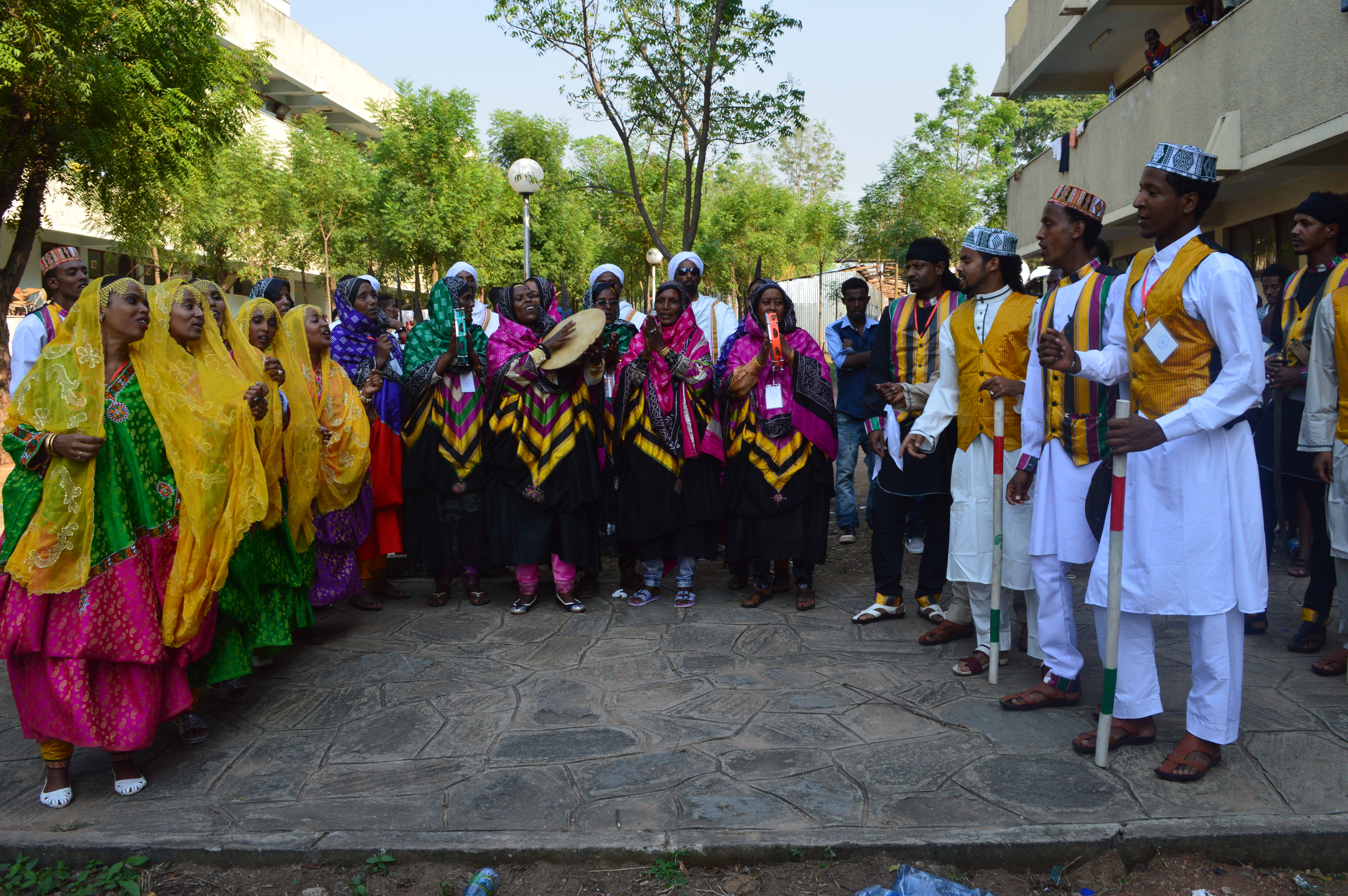
- A group of Hararis at a wedding dressed in cultural attire in Harar

Total population
- estimated 200,000

Regions with significant populations
- Ethiopia: 50,000-70,000 (Using 2021 Election Data and 2017 Census Projections)

Languages
- Harari

Religion
- Sunni Islam

Related ethnic groups
- Argobba • Amhara • Gurage • Tigrayans • Tigrinya • Halaba • Siltʼe • Zay

The Harari people (Harari: ጌይ ኡሱኣች / ݘٛىيْ أُسُأَڛْ, Gēy Usuach, "People of the City") is a Semitic-speaking ethnic group which inhabits the Horn of Africa. Members of this ethnic group traditionally reside in the walled city of Harar, simply called Gēy "the City" in Harari, situated in the Harari Region of eastern Ethiopia. They speak the Harari language, a member of the South Ethiopic grouping within the Semitic subfamily of the Afroasiatic languages.

== History ==
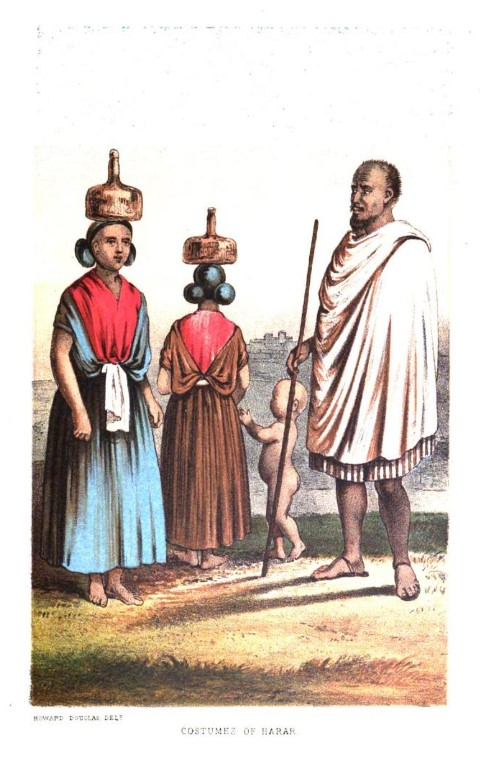
Richard Burton's illustration of the Harari people's costumes.

The Harla people, an extinct Afroasiatic-speaking people native to Hararghe, are considered by most scholars to be the precursors to the Harari people. The ancestors of the Hararis moved across the Bab-el-Mandeb, settling in the shores of Somalia and later expanding into the interior producing a Semitic-speaking population among Cushitic and non-Afroasiatic-speaking peoples in what would become Harar. These early Semitic settlers in the region were believed to be of Hadhrami stock.

Sheikh Abadir, the legendary patriarch of the Harari, is said to have arrived in the Harar plateau in the early thirteenth century, where he was met by the Harla, Gaturi and Argobba people. In the Middle Ages Hararis led by Abadir supposedly came into conflict with the Shirazi people who had occupied Somalia's coast. By the thirteenth century, the Hararis were among the administrators of the Ifat Sultanate. In the fourteenth century raids on the Harari town of Get (Gey) by Abyssinian Emperor Amda Seyon I, Hararis are referred to as Harlas. Ifat state under Haqq ad-Din II relocated their base to the Harari plateau (Adal) in the fourteenth century. An alliance kingdom ensued between Argobba and Harari people designated the Adal Sultanate which later included Afar and Somali people. In the sixteenth century under Ahmed ibn Ibrahim al-Ghazi, the Harari state stretched to large parts of the Horn of Africa. During the Ethiopian–Adal war, some Harari militia (malassay) settled in Gurage territory, forming the Siltʼe people. Hararis once represented the largest concentration of agriculturalists in East Africa.

In the sixteenth century, walls built around the city of Harar during the reign of Emir Nur ibn Mujahid helped preserve Harari identity from being assimilated by the Oromo. Harari colonies in the middle of the seaboard and Harar were also assimilated by Somalis putting the Sultanate of Adal under duress. Hararis confined in the walled city became the last remnants of a once large ethnic group that inhabited the region. According to Ulrich Braukämper, the Harla-Harari were most likely active in the region prior to the Adal Sultanate's Islamic invasion of Ethiopia.

The sixteenth century saw Oromos invading regions of the Horn of Africa from the northern areas of Hargeisa to its southern portions such as Lower Juba, incorporating the Harari people. Hararis were furious when Muhammad Gasa decided to move the Adal Sultanate's capital from Harar to Aussa in 1577 in response to Oromo threats. In less than a year after its relocation Adal would collapse. Harari imams continued to have a presence in the southern Afar Region in the Imamate of Aussa until they were overthrown in the eighteenth century by the Mudaito dynasty, who later established the Sultanate of Aussa.

Among the assimilated peoples were Arab Muslims that arrived during the start of the Islamic period, as well as Argobba and other migrants that were drawn to Harar's well-developed culture. Statistics prove that a Semitic-speaking people akin to the Harari may have inhabited a stretch of land between the Karkaar Mountains, the middle Awash and Jijiga. Oromo migrations have effectively split this putative ethnolinguistic block to the Lake Zway islands, Gurage territory, and Harar. Following the decline of the Adal Sultanate's ascendancy in the area, a large number of the Harari were in turn reportedly absorbed into the Oromo community. In the Emirate of Harar period, Hararis sent missionaries to convert Oromo to Islam. The loss of the crucial Battle of Chelenqo marked the end of Harar's independence in 1887. Opposition to Emperor Menelik II's forces persisted into the late 1890s, notably spearheaded by Talha Jafar, who received assistance from Hararis as well as other Muslim groups in the region. Hararis supported the designated but uncrowned Emperor of Ethiopia Lij Iyasu, and his presumed efforts to make Harar the capital of an African Islamic empire. Iyasu was however overthrown in 1916, and many of his Harari followers were jailed.

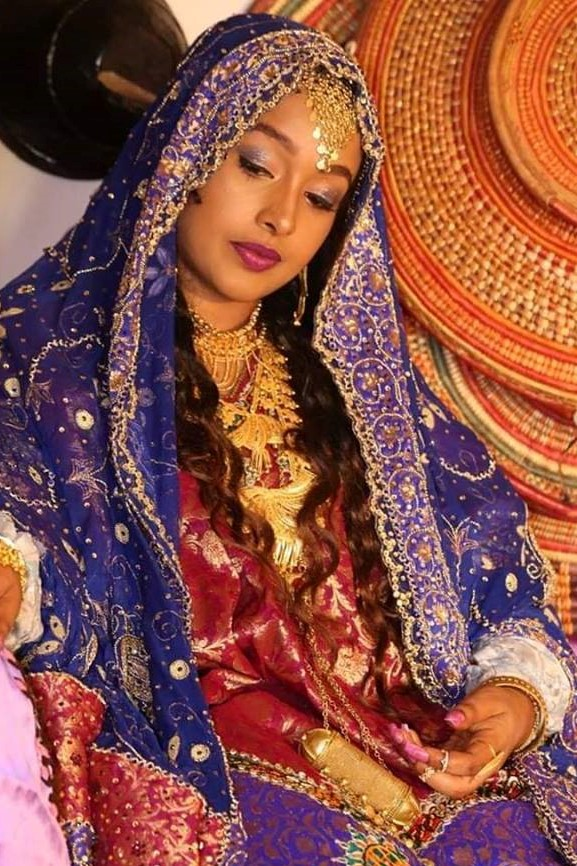
Harari woman in traditional attire

Chafing under imperial Ethiopian rule, Hararis made several attempts to cut ties with Ethiopia and unify Hararghe with Somalia, among them launching the nationalist Kulub movement which was linked to the Somali Youth League. These events led to the Haile Selassie government's ethnic cleansing efforts on Hararis. A Harar Oromo proverb alludes to this occasion: "On that day Hararis were eliminated from earth." Former Mayor of Harar Bereket Selassie reported that both the Amhara and Oromo viewed Hararis with contempt. Haile Selassie's overthrow by the Derg communist regime made minor differences for the Harari; they describe it as "little more than a transition from the frying pan into the fire". The 1975 rural act disenfranchised Hararis from their farm land, forcing many to emigrate. The surviving Harari relatives of Kulub movement members would join the Somali Armed Forces; and some, having been promoted as high-ranking military officers, fought in the Ogaden War to free Harari and Somali territory from Ethiopian rule. Hararis were also involved in the WSLF. After Ethiopians won the war in Ogaden, Derg soldiers began massacring civilians in Harari areas of Addis Ababa for collaborating with Somalis. The aftermath of the Ogaden war resulted in 200,000 Hararis being held at southern Somalia's refuge camps in 1979. Today Hararis are outnumbered in their own state by the Amhara and Oromo peoples. Under the Meles Zenawi administration, Hararis had been favored tremendously. They acquired control of their Harari Region again, and have been given special rights not offered to other groups in the region. According to academic Sarah Vaughan, the Harari People's National Regional State was created to overturn the historically bad relationship between Harar and the Ethiopian government.

Some Hararis as well as the Somali Sheekhal and Hadiya Halaba clans assert descent from Abadir Umar ar-Rida, also known as Fiqi Umar, who traced his lineage to the first caliph, Abu Bakr. According to the explorer Richard Francis Burton, "Fiqi Umar" crossed over from the Arabian Peninsula to the Horn of Africa ten generations prior to 1854, with his six sons: Umar the Greater, Umar the Lesser, the two Abdillahs, Ahmad and Siddiq. According to Hararis, they also consist of seven Harla subclans: Abogn, Adish, Awari’, Gidaya, Gatur, Hargaya, and Wargar. The Harari were previously known as "Adere", although this term is now considered derogatory.

Arsi Oromo state an intermarriage took place between their ancestors and the previous inhabitants Adere (Harari) whom they call the Hadiya. Hadiya clans claim their forefathers were Harari however they later became influenced by Sidama. Moreover, the Habar Habusheed, a major branch of the Somali Isaaq clan family consisting of the Habr Je'lo, Sanbur, Ibran and Tol Je'lo clans in Somaliland and Ethiopia, hold the tradition that they originate from an intermarriage between a Harari woman and their forefather Sheikh Ishaaq.

== Language ==
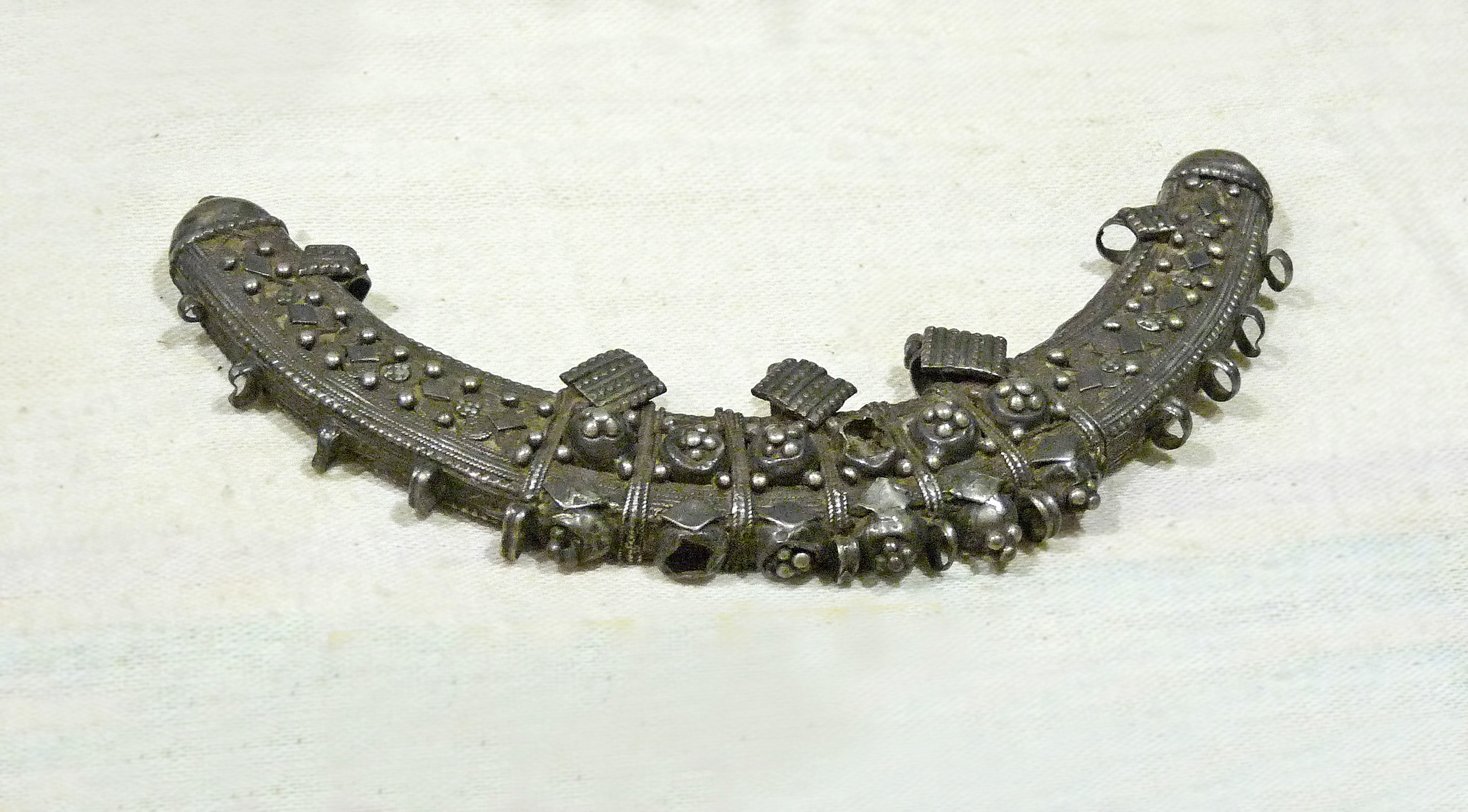
Harari pendant, held at the Museum of Natural History and Ethnography in Colmar.

The Harari people speak the Harari language, an Ethiosemitic language referred to as Gey Sinan ("Language of the City"). It is closely related to the eastern Gurage languages and similar to Zay and Silt'e, all of whom are linked to the Harla language. Old Harari already had many Arabic loanwords, proven by the ancient texts. Northern Somali dialects use Harari loanwords. The Zeila songs of thirteenth century origin, popular in Somaliland are considered to be using Old Harari. Historians states the language spoken by the Imams and Sultans of Adal would closely resemble contemporary Harari language.

Modern Harari is influenced more by Oromo than Somali and the presence of Arabic is still there. After the eighteenth century Egyptian conquest of Harar, numerous loanwords were additionally borrowed from Egyptian Arabic.

Gafat language, now extinct, was once spoken in the Blue Nile was related to a Harari dialect. Harari language has some form of correlation with Swahili and Maghrebi Arabic. Prior to Oromo encircling the Harar region, its postulated Harari speakers were in direct contact with Sidama, Afar and Somali.

The first known Harari language dictionary in English was published by British traveler Henry Salt in 1814.

The Harari language was historically written using the Arabic script and in characters known as "Harari secret script" of unknown origin. More recently in the 1990s, it has been transcribed with the Ge'ez script. Harari is also commonly written in Latin outside of Ethiopia.

The 1994 Ethiopian census indicates that there were 21,757 Harari speakers. About 20,000 of these individuals were concentrated outside Harar, in Ethiopia's capital Addis Ababa.

Most Harari people are bilingual in Amharic and Oromo, both of which are also Afro-Asiatic languages. According to the 1994 Ethiopian census, about 2,351 are monolingual, speaking only Harari.

== Religion ==
The majority of Harari are Sunni Muslim. The earliest kabir or Islamic teacher in the community was Aw Sofi Yahya, a Harari scholar who was contemporary of the patron saint of Harar called Shaykh Abadir and it was from him that the first Qur'anic school was built around 10 kilometres (6.2 mi) to the south of the city center. The predominant strand or self-identification adopted by Harari people is Sunni or non-denominational Islam.

== Diaspora ==
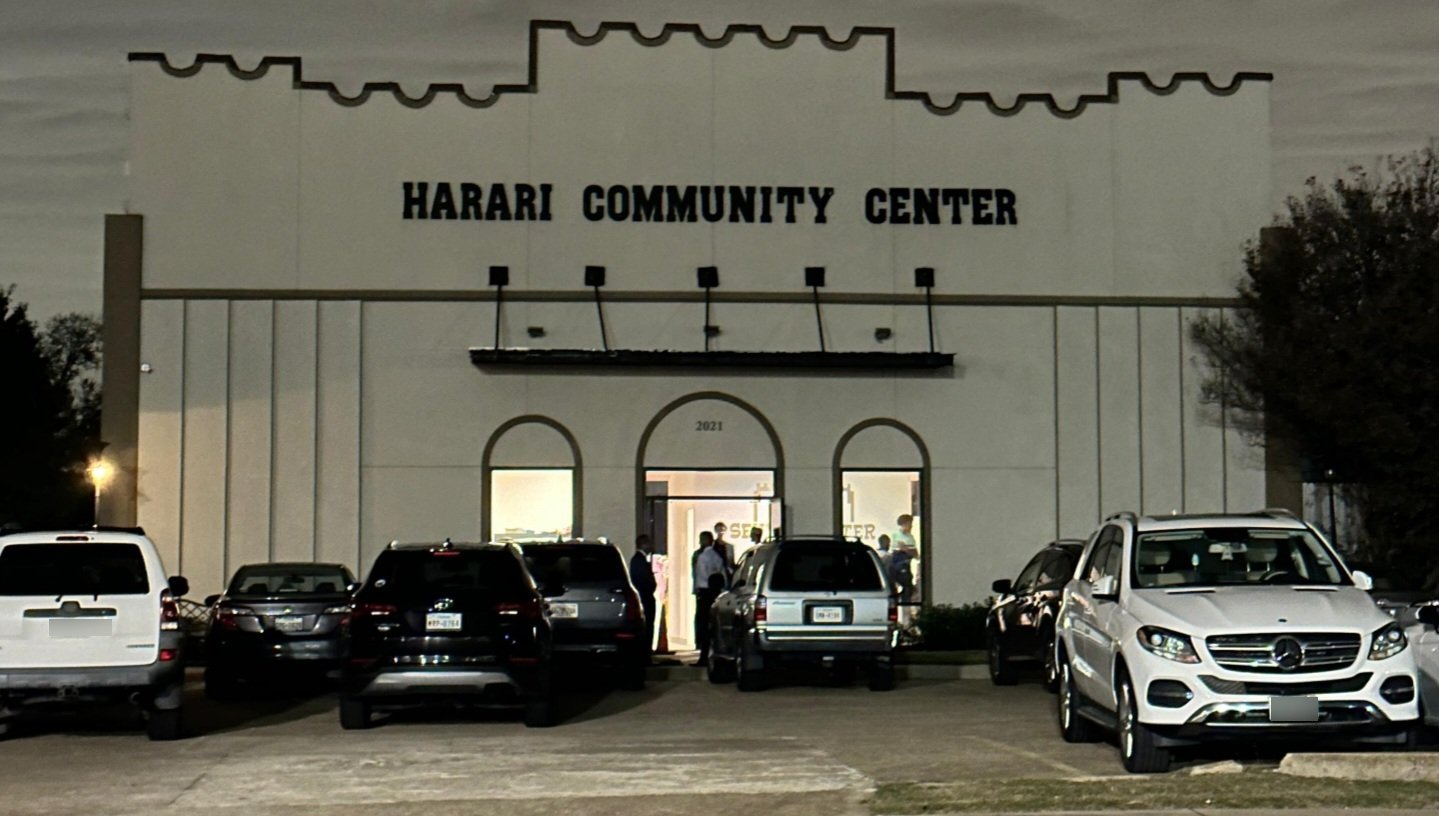
Harari Community Development Center in Garland, Texas.

Hararis comprise under 10% within their own city, due to ethnic cleansing by the Haile Selassie regime. Thousands of Hararis were forced to leave Harar in the 1940s. Harari people moved throughout Ethiopia, mainly to Addis Ababa, Dire Dawa, and Jijiga establishing families and businesses as well as neighborhood associations (Afocha). There is a considerable Harari population in Djibouti, Saudi Arabia, Somalia and Yemen. The Harari people have also spread throughout North America, mainly to Washington D.C., Atlanta, Toronto, Dallas, Los Angeles, and Memphis. Furthermore, a minority of the Harari people live in Europe in countries such as Germany, Switzerland, Austria, Sweden and the United Kingdom, and also outside of Europe in Australia.

== Basketry Art ==
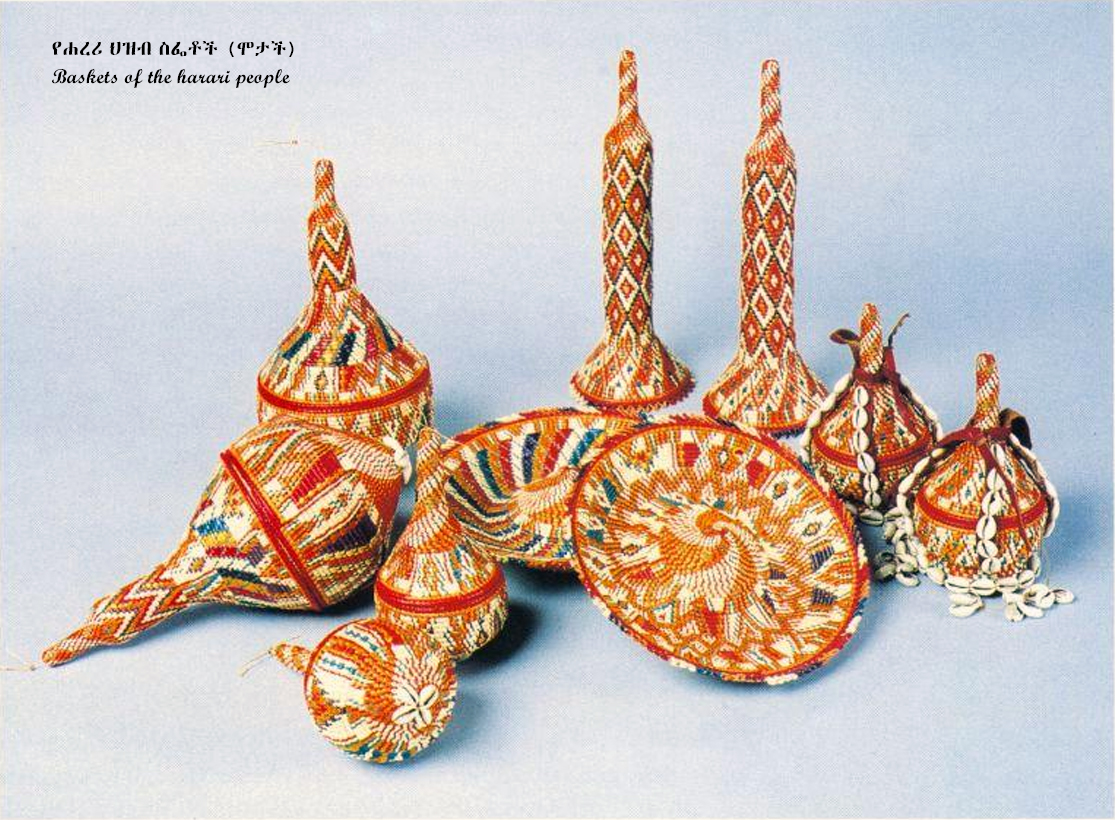
Some of the luxurious Harari baskets, called "Mot" (Harari = ጌይ ሞት), today registered and certified as a Harari trademark.

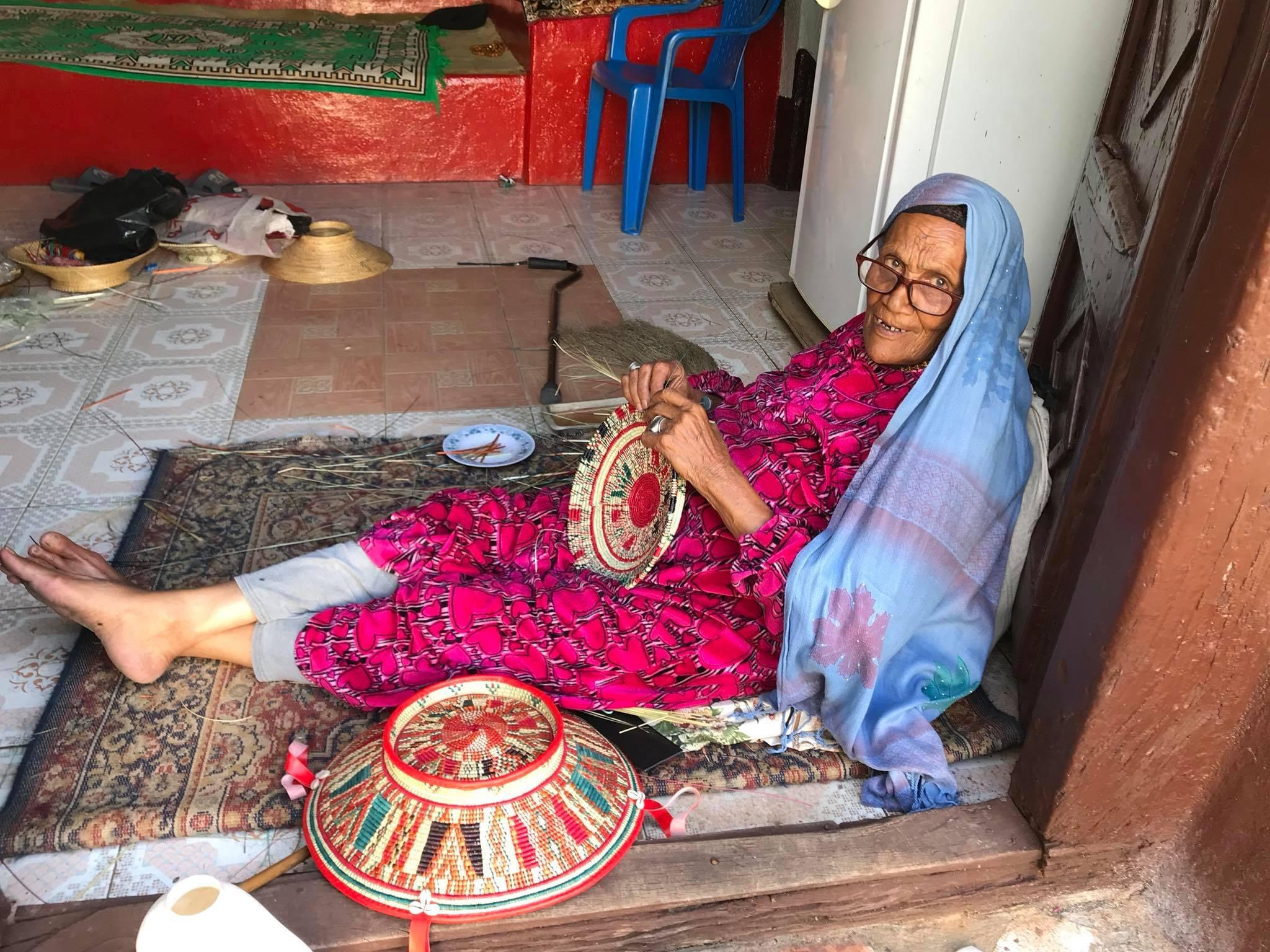
An old Harari woman making a pair of Hamat Mot, one of the most expansive Harari basket.

The Hararis are known to be the masters of basketry in Ethiopia, decorated with complex geometric patterns, and renowned for their quality and beauty. Those baskets are often used for special occasions such as weddings, mournings, but mostly for house decoration. In addition, the Mesob (traditional basketwork table) was invented by the Harari people. Harari baskets are considered valuable handicrafts, mainly used by wealthier Harari families, and are highly appreciated and prized not only locally, but also in the Ethiopian craft market and among crafts collectors from all over the world. They are a remarkable example of traditional Ethiopian craftsmanship and demonstrate the cultural richness of the Harar region.

== Harari traditional houses ==
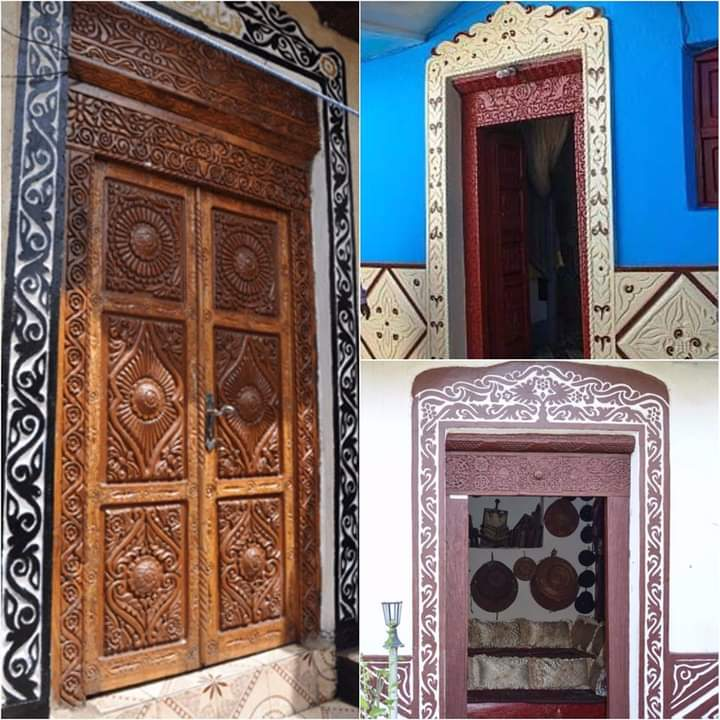
Harari house doors, carved in stone and wood.

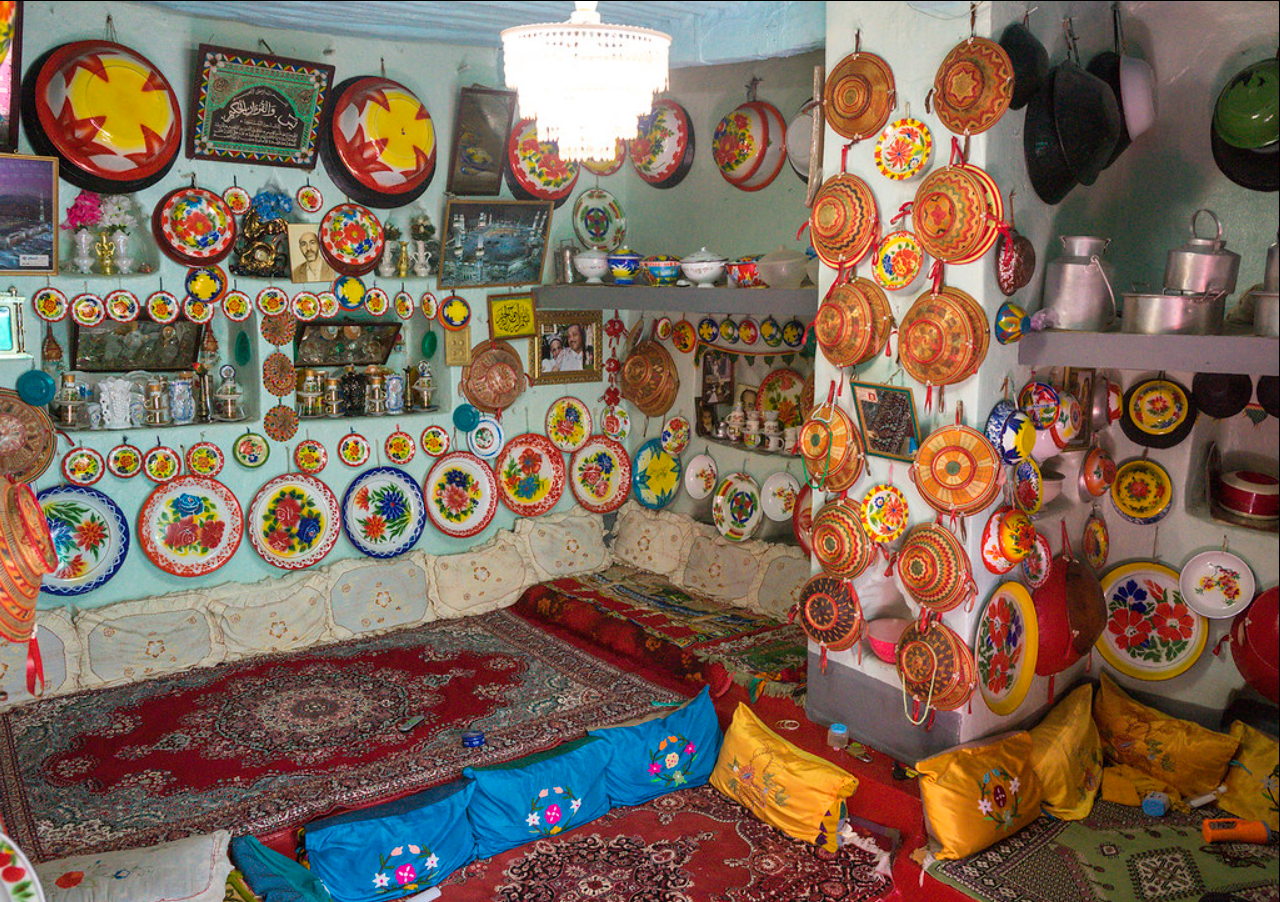
Main room of a Harari house (ጌይ ጋር).

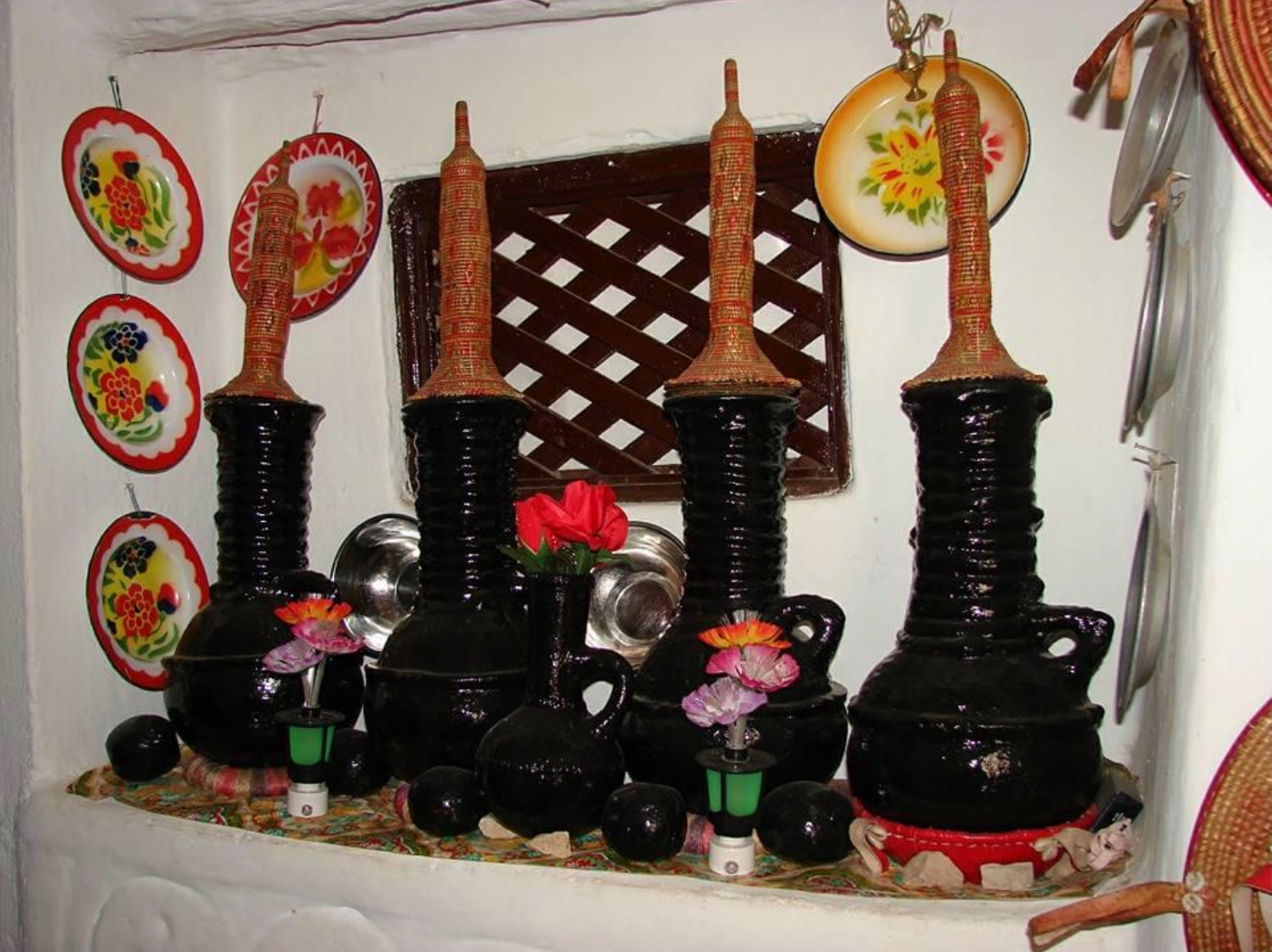
Harari traditional "Aflala" pots in a wealthy Harari house.

Harari houses are known to be richly decorated with beautiful handcrafted wall baskets with very intricate designs (made by Harari women), as well as enameled plates with floral patterns (plates imported to Ethiopia after the Second World War by Japanese traders). The ground floor is dedicated to the kitchen and living room. The main room has large steps covered with carpets and pillows, called "Nedeba", where family members and guests take their seats according to their rank. The floors are devoted to bedrooms. In the wealthiest families, 4 black clay pots, called "Aflala", are placed on a stone shelf, carved into the wall, where all valuable goods were stored, such as gold, coins, medicine and coffee beans.

== Harari Family Names ==
In the Gēy Usu' community, social organization is structured around a network of approximately 300 named households (Ishāra Sum). Each household can trace its ancestry back to a male ancestor, who is identified by a personal name or nickname, often linked to his characteristics or physical description, occupational title, estate name, or place name. Every community member belongs to one of these households, signifying descent through the paternal line. The Gēy Usu' follow the Muslim tradition of taking the father's name as a second name, which aids in tracking lineage through generations. Ultimately, each paternal line concludes with the name of the household's original founder. In Harari tradition, household names start with ‘Aw’.

A

Abādiro, Abba Did, Abba Dirro, Abba Gidir, Abba Haqqa, Abba Irré, Abdāl, Abrāmo, Abob, Abogn, Abokar, Abonis, Abulkheys, Abulsir, Adaré, Adāwo, Addilādalogn, Ādish, Addéllé, Affān, Ağa-Afandi, Agri, Ahmad Turki, Ajés, Alla Sat’, Alla Kén, Allām, Ali Bāl, Ali Fif, Ali Hamdogn, Ali Muz, Amāno, Amāri, Andārgé, Angat Sas, Ānis, Aniyo, Āqil, Arab Hassan, Arab Ali, Argobba, Arārso, Asala, At’iro, Āw Alawi, Āw Ali, Awtād, Awāri’, Āwo, Āyrahima

B

Badi, Bahar Sheikh, Baharun, Bakarina, Barāso, Baréda, Barré, Barkhadlé, Bāro, Bartiré, Bāshi, Bashiro, Batt’olé, Bilal, Bilit, Bita, Bito, Bishāro, Bona, Bomba, Bor, Borri, Buba, Bukur, Bukush, Bullālé, Bulé, Bulluqa, Bunturo, Burhāna, Burré

C

Ch’alla, Ch’abaqo, Ch’āma’

D

Dābara Sheikh, Daddafi, Dagāga, Dalu, Dāmis, Danboba, Darda’, Dārat Shuhum, Darémo, Daw, Dazzo, Débis, Dibbé, Dilbu, Dinzar, Dini, Dirir, Dirsahan, Diyāb(i), Dobi, Doch’o, Dolāl, Dolo, Doyo, Duālé, Duldul, Dunquqo, Durār, Dus, Dusāma

E

Ébla

F

Fallo, Fandish, Farada, Faraj, Fatah, Fasih, Fazal, Feiruz, Fuddi Géllé, Fur Hamāt

G

Gadād, Gadid, Gaja, Galmo, Ganamé, Garād, Garādo, Garānāqabi, Gato, Gātur, Gélléy Gélléy, Gidāya, Gino, Giridlé, Gog, Golé, Golo, Gonis, Gorācho, Gosh, Gudoro, Gugguba, Gugnalé, Gula, Gulul, Gurrācho, Guré, Guréy, Gutu

H

Hachiro, Hamdial, Hāmo, Haqqo, Hangulla, Hargāya, Hariro, Harshi Fur, Hāsh, Hāshim, Hay, Hay Lamad, Haybé Ukhāt, Hay wā Ukhāt

I

Idāl, Ifāté, Ilbor, Illi, Imāmo, Irgu, Ishété

J

Jān, Jannato, Jajaba, Jaldo, Jiddāwi, Jilo, Jin Hayāk, Jirābé, Julam, Juma

K

Kabiro, Kākaji, Kalaf, Kalafoyé, Karabu, Khālib, Khamis, Kharāb, Khatib, Khāya, Khayro, Kénnāwāq, Kibo, Kilo, Kitāb T’or, Kullé, Kula, Kurmiyé, Kurra, Kurtu (Haramaya), Kurtu (Dadar)

L

Lach’a, Lām Hangur, Lāzim, Laylimār, Libān, Limāy, Limāybādu, Lollo

M

Magāla Inchi, Magāla Kuro, Magāla Shuhum, Magāla Ukhāt, Magan, Malāq Ali, Malāq Yousuf, Maléyé, Manch’aror, Mandida, Mandaré, Manor, Manufa, Marda, Mardin, Marach’i Gudor, Māru, Maro, Mata, Mato, Matona, Mat’ari, Matiba, Māwi, Mawlud, Mizān, Mogno, Moti, Mudir, Muhammad Turki, Mumiyé, Munji, Munshi, Muqdish, Muqri, Murjān, Murāyat, Muslih, Muslim, Muz

N

Nabi, Nachih Afar, Nagayo, Nasir, Nasroy, Nāzaro, Nurish, Nuro, Nuré

Q

Qachino, Qala, Qalo, Qāmus, Qanani, Qānt’a, Qarmān, Qarshi, Qat’i, Qawwé, Qéh Afar, Qirāt’, Qorrām, Qoshlé, Qumāsh, Qurrabé Limāy, Qutt'i

R

Rābis, Rahas, Rais, Rauuf, Roba, Rutt’a Bun

S

Sabri, Sabro, Sabban, Sābit, Sādiq, Safar, Safāri, Sahal, Sakambara, Salmāno, Sallit’o, Samilāl, Samod, Sāni, Sarmadi, Sawākin, Sāyo, Shādir, Shagni, Shāmi, Shano, Sharro, Shāribān, Sharif Bitt’i, Sharif Kuta, Sharif Shilli, Shānqo, Shāsh, Sheibi, Sheikh, Sémgarād, Shiqo, Shirwa’, Shumburo, Sid, Siddisto, Silki, Siné, Sirré, Sodo, Sofi, Sogiddo, Sorro, Subhān, Sukkar, Surur

T

Tabālāli, Tāj, Tartu, T’alha, T’āy, T’ey, T’illi Qéhri, T’inna, T’irra, T’iri, T’iyo, Turé

U

Ugāz, Umar Ziyad, Unqa Sheikh, Utāla (Tāla), Uzun

W

Wabar, Wābta, Wādla, Wākané, Wālaka, Wāraho, Walé, Wāllāy, Wānch’a Walam, Wanāgo, Wāqo, Warramakka, Warābo, Warfa’, Wargār, Wari, Warsi, Warso, Wāsla, Wazir, Widāto

Y

Yaré

Z

Zāhid, Zakkamari, Zeidi, Ziqéh, Zimalkāgn

== Notable Hararis ==
- 'Abd Allah II ibn 'Ali 'Abd ash-Shakur, last Emir of Harar
- `Ali ibn Da`ud, founder of the Emirate of Harar
- Abu Bakr ibn Muhammad, Sultan of the Adal Sultanate
- Mahfuz, Imam and General of the Adal Sultanate
- Bati del Wambara, Queen of the Adal Sultanate
- Ahmad ibn Ibrahim al-Ghazi, Imam and General of the Adal Sultanate
- Nur ibn Mujahid, founder of Sultanate of Harar
- Arab Faqih, author of Futuh Al-Habasha
- Shaykh Abdullah al-Harari, Mujtahid, Muhaddith, and Mujaddid of the 20th Century
- Shaykh Muhammad ibn 'Abd al-Salam, Grandson of Kabir Khalil and the Greatest Teacher of Shakh Abdullah al-Harari
- Abdullahi Sadiq, businessman and Governor of Ogaden
- Abogn ibn Adish, Garad and Emir of the Adal Sultanate
- Duri Mohammed, former President of Addis Ababa University
- Kabir Khalil, 19th century Muslim scholar in the Emirate of Harar
- Samia Zekaria, Ethiopian diplomat
- Murad Abdulhadi, Ethiopian politician
- Maria Yusuf, Activist, Judge
- Nebila Abdulmelik, Activist
- Mohammed Ahmed, former CEO of Ethiopian Airlines
- Kemal Bedri, Judge
- Huda Mukbil, Activist
- Fariyal Abdullahi, American Chef
- Shamitu, Singer
- Din Mukhtar (Agent 00), Canadian-American Streamer
- Aysha Harun, Canadian-American Social Media Personality
- Dr. Ahmed Zekaria, Historian & Professor
- Abdallah Sherif, Museum Founder & Curator
- Aymen "Anthony" Saleh, CEO of Emagen Entertainment Group Inc.
- Muna Abubeker, Philologist
- Yimaj Kalifa, Businessman
- Sara Aduse, Author & Activist
- Chinutay Manal, YouTuber

== See also ==
- Garad, an old Harari title
- Malassay, Harari corps
- Kabir, title for scholar in the Emirate of Harar
- Aw, title for father
- Harari Region
- Harar City - Diaspora
- East Hararghe Zone
- List of Emirs of Harar
- List of ethnic groups in Ethiopia
- Sultanate of Adal
