= Afoča =

Harari community neighborhood association

Afoča (Harari: አፎቸ), also spelled as Afocha, is a Harari community neighborhood association.

== History ==
Anthropologist Elisabeth-Dorthea Hecht, states Afočas have existed for at least three generations within the Harari society. While others assert that it traces its origins to the seventeenth century Emirate of Harar. American sociologist Sidney Waldron posits that neighborhood associations might have influenced the political landscape of Harar in the mid-1800s. After the passing of Emir Ahmad III ibn Abu Bakr, Abdallahi Abd al-Mejid took temporary control but was ousted as a result of a consensus among the five Afochas.

According to Ethiopian historian Mohammed Hassen, the Afoča played a key role as a Harari defense measure, orchestrating national mobilization, which thwarted the city of Harar and its inhabitants from suffering the same fate as their kin, the now extinct Harla people.

== Aspects ==
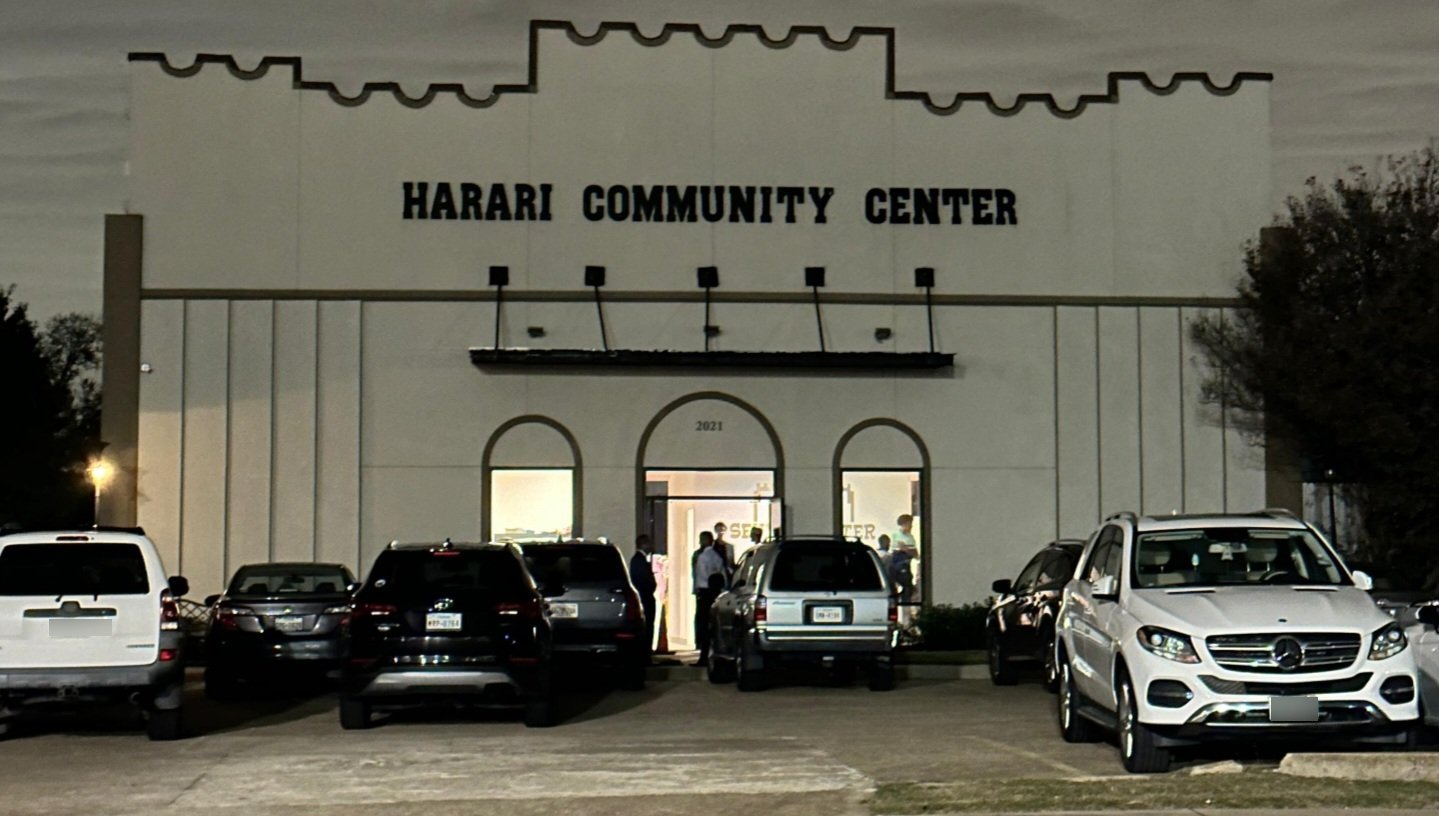
Harari Community Development Center in Garland, Texas.

An Afoča consists of the following:

=== Membership ===
The coalition is customarily based on age and gender. Men's Afoča is generally complimentary, while the women's Afocha includes a charge due to high expenditures linked to the latter on special occasions.

=== Objectives ===
Some of its main focuses are to assist members financially during their funerals (amuta gar) and weddings (balachu gar). Chairman of the men's Afoča prioritizes economic support while the chairwoman of the women's Afoča focuses mainly on the mutual sharing of jubilation and melancholy.

== See also ==
- Chōnaikai
