= Neighborhood association =

Voluntary civic organization representing residents of a geographic area

A neighbourhood association (also neighborhood association, community association, or residents' association) is a voluntary organization of residents within a geographically defined area who work together to address local issues, advocate on planning and development matters, and foster community cohesion. Neighbourhood associations exist worldwide, though their legal status, organizational structure, and degree of integration into municipal governance vary significantly by country. They are generally distinguished from homeowner associations (HOAs) by their voluntary membership, absence of coercive legal authority over property, and focus on civic advocacy rather than private property regulation.

Research suggests that neighbourhood associations serve as "schools of democracy" in which residents are socialized into political participation and civic engagement. They strengthen links between residents and policymakers, mobilize communities around local concerns, and contribute to the development of social capital. However, scholars and policymakers have also raised concerns about the demographic representativeness of these organizations, particularly in the context of housing supply debates, where associations have been criticized for amplifying the preferences of older, wealthier homeowners at the expense of renters, younger residents, and racialized communities.

== Distinction from homeowners associations ==
The term neighbourhood association is sometimes used interchangeably with homeowner association (HOA), but the two are fundamentally different types of organization.

Neighbourhood associations are voluntary civic bodies. Membership is open to any resident of the defined area (typically including both homeowners and renters), dues are nominal or nonexistent, and the organization has no legal authority to enforce rules on private property. Their influence is exercised through advocacy, persuasion, and participation in public planning processes. In the United States, neighborhood associations may be incorporated as 501(c)(4) nonprofit organizations and enjoy tax-exempt status.

HOAs, by contrast, are typically established by real estate developers and made mandatory through Covenants, Conditions, and Restrictions (CC&Rs) registered on property titles. Membership is automatic upon property purchase and cannot be declined. HOAs levy compulsory assessments, enforce architectural standards, and in many U.S. states possess the legal power to place liens on properties or initiate foreclosure proceedings for non-compliance.

Neighbourhood associations are more commonly found in older, established neighbourhoods that predate HOA-style development, while HOAs are generally created at the time a subdivision is constructed and sold. In some cases, both types of organization may exist within overlapping geographic boundaries.

== United States ==
In the United States, the rules governing the formation and recognition of neighbourhood associations are sometimes regulated at the city or state level. Some American neighbourhood associations are incorporated and recognized by the Internal Revenue Service as 501(c)(4) nonprofit organizations. Neighbourhood councils, a related but distinct type of entity, are governmental structures whose officers are generally elected and which may encompass multiple neighbourhood associations.

American neighbourhood associations typically focus on general advocacy, community events, neighbourhood safety, beautification, and liaison with municipal government. They reinforce community standards through education, peer pressure, and informal social norms rather than through legally binding rules.

== Canada ==
Canadian neighbourhood associations (also called community associations or, in parts of Ontario, ratepayers' associations) are voluntary, grassroots nonprofit organizations that serve as the primary channel between residents and municipal government on planning and development matters. They are structurally, legally, and philosophically distinct from American HOAs: they cannot levy mandatory fees, enforce property rules, place liens, or restrict land use. Their influence flows entirely from civic participation and persuasion. A 2016 study by the University of Calgary School of Public Policy described community associations as a "critical quasi-institutional fourth level of government."

=== Legal framework ===
Canadian neighbourhood associations are typically incorporated as nonprofit societies under provincial legislation, such as the Societies Act (SBC 2015, c. 18) in British Columbia or the Societies Act (RSA 2000, c. S-14) in Alberta. These statutes require elected boards, annual general meetings, financial reporting, and prohibit carrying on business for profit. Incorporation is encouraged by municipalities because it provides legal personality and limits the personal liability of board members, though it is not legally required to operate as an association.

Membership is voluntary and open to any resident within the association's geographic boundaries for a nominal annual fee, typically between $5 and $25. Both renters and homeowners may participate equally. This stands in contrast to the small number of Canadian planned communities (particularly in Alberta, such as Lake Bonavista, Auburn Bay, and McKenzie Towne) that have developer-created residents' associations with mandatory title-registered fees more closely resembling American HOAs. These are legally and functionally distinct from the voluntary associations that are the subject of civic planning debate.

=== Role in municipal planning ===
One of the most significant functions of Canadian neighbourhood associations is their formal or semi-formal integration into municipal land-use planning and development review processes. Unlike American HOAs, which primarily regulate private property within their own boundaries, Canadian associations participate in the public planning system as consultative partners of municipal government.

The degree of formalization varies by municipality. At the most structured end, the City of Victoria's Community Association Land Use Committee (CALUC) system requires that developers contact the appropriate neighbourhood association and host a community meeting before the city will even accept a rezoning application. A minimum 30-day waiting period follows, and CALUC letters summarizing community feedback are formally attached to staff reports presented to council. At the informal end, Vancouver has no formal municipal program recognizing neighbourhood associations; groups such as the Coalition of Vancouver Neighbourhoods participate in the planning process as members of the general public through advisory committees and public hearings.

In most Canadian cities, when a developer submits a rezoning application or proposes changes to an official community plan, city planning staff notify the relevant neighbourhood association and invite feedback. Associations gather input from their membership and relay it to city hall. While Canadian associations have no veto power over development, municipalities rely on them to channel public engagement and identify neighbourhood-level concerns early in the process.

The statutory foundation in British Columbia is Section 475 of the Local Government Act, which requires municipalities to provide consultation opportunities during official community plan development but does not specifically name neighbourhood associations as mandatory consultees, leaving municipalities broad discretion.

=== City-specific models ===
==== Calgary ====
Calgary has the most mature community association system in Canada. The Federation of Calgary Communities, founded in 1961, supports over 230 nonprofit organizations including 156 community associations, representing more than 20,000 volunteers, making it the largest collective volunteer movement in the city. Community associations form Planning and Development Committees of six to twelve volunteers that receive formal circulation of all planning applications within their boundaries. The City employs Neighbourhood Partnership Coordinators who work directly with associations, and the Federation delivers over 50 free workshops per year and publishes guides including The Community Guide to the Planning Process.

==== Edmonton ====
Edmonton's community leagues date to 1917 and are coordinated by the Edmonton Federation of Community Leagues (EFCL), founded in 1921. The city formally recognizes the relationship through City Policy C-110 (adopted 1980), which identifies each league as "a useful mechanism for debate of area concerns and presentation of views and recommendations to Council" and the EFCL as the "Representative and Co-ordinating body." Edmonton's approximately 157 leagues receive formal notification of rezoning applications and can appear before the Subdivision and Development Appeal Board on discretionary permits.

==== Nanaimo ====
The City of Nanaimo adopted a formal Neighbourhood Association Supports Policy in April 2022, recognizing 20 active associations. To receive municipal support, including development referrals and staff liaison assistance, associations must meet organizational criteria: maintaining an elected executive, holding annual general meetings, keeping records, and engaging their membership for input before responding to development referrals such as rezoning and official community plan applications. The city's official community plan directs Council to host annual engagement opportunities to hear collective neighbourhood priorities.

==== Toronto ====
Toronto has over 100 neighbourhood associations. The Federation of North Toronto Residents' Associations (FoNTRA) alone represents more than 30 associations and over 170,000 residents. The city does not formally recognize associations through a registration program, but they are described in academic literature as major participants in urban politics and the principal foil to the city's development industry. Pre-application consultation with City staff became mandatory in November 2022, with applicants encouraged to consult local communities. In Ontario, associations have historically been called ratepayers' associations or ratepayer groups, reflecting an older focus on taxation and fiscal accountability.

=== Impact of British Columbia's 2023 housing legislation ===
In November 2023, the Government of British Columbia passed Bills 44, 46, and 47, which mandated small-scale multi-unit housing (three to four units per lot, six near transit) across the province and, most consequentially for neighbourhood associations, prohibited public hearings for development applications consistent with the official community plan. Bill 18 (April 2024) applied equivalent restrictions to Vancouver under the Vancouver Charter.

This legislation significantly reduced the formal consultative role of neighbourhood associations. Victoria's Fairfield Gonzales Community Association acknowledged that under OCP-2050, applications meeting the zones within the plan would no longer be forwarded to the neighbourhood CALUC for consideration. The Coalition of Vancouver Neighbourhoods characterized the changes as "entirely anti-democratic." The practical result is a bifurcated system: associations retain consultative input for applications exceeding official community plan parameters, but the majority of routine housing development now proceeds without formal neighbourhood association involvement.

=== Representation and demographic concerns ===
The most rigorous academic examination of Canadian neighbourhood association demographics is Moore and McGregor's 2021 study in Urban Studies, which used individual-level survey data from the 2018 municipal elections in Toronto and Vancouver. The study found that association members are disproportionately white, older, more educated, and more likely to be homeowners who have lived in their homes longer than the average voter, though their ideological orientation differs little from the broader public.

A Metro Vancouver housing panel identified neighbourhood associations as problematic, noting that opponents to development may not be representative of the broader population. The Ontario Human Rights Commission has called for a provincial strategy to address and prevent discriminatory NIMBY opposition. A 2022 study in the World Leisure Journal found that neighbourhood association initiatives often target young families and encompass traditional settler-colonial themes with minimal effort to involve people of different ages, racial identities, and cultural backgrounds.

However, researchers at Simon Fraser University have argued that eliminating neighbourhood-level engagement disproportionately harms disadvantaged communities. Their research on South Vancouver, home to the city's largest share of racialized residents (80%) and immigrants (56%), found these neighbourhoods are not receiving equitable public services. In June 2023, community advocates from the South Vancouver Neighbourhood House successfully brought a motion to Vancouver Council addressing historic infrastructure inequities, demonstrating that the same consultation mechanisms used by affluent neighbourhoods to oppose development can also be used by disadvantaged communities to demand equity.

=== Notable controversies ===
Several high-profile cases have illustrated the tension between neighbourhood associations and housing supply in Canada:

- In October 2022, the Kits Point Residents Association filed a BC Supreme Court petition seeking to block the Squamish Nation's 6,000-unit Senakw rental housing project by challenging the services agreement between the Nation and the City of Vancouver. Justice Forth dismissed the petition in September 2023.
- In 2024, 52 Calgary community associations signed a joint letter opposing the city's blanket rezoning, alongside 88% of more than 6,000 written public submissions. Council passed the rezoning 9 to 6.
- In November 2025, the Coalition of Vancouver Neighbourhoods urged council not to approve Vancouver's Social Housing Initiative, which would have permitted 6 to 20 storey non-profit housing towers across neighbourhoods.

A 2023 survey by Habitat for Humanity Canada found that 54% of Canadians believe NIMBY sentiment is a main barrier to affordable housing.

=== Reform proposals ===
The emergence of YIMBY organizations in Canadian cities, such as the Vancouver Area Neighbours Association, Abundant Housing Vancouver, and HousingNowTO, represents a grassroots counterweight to established neighbourhood associations, functioning similarly but advocating explicitly for increased housing supply. The University of Calgary School of Public Policy has recommended that municipalities clearly define whether association feedback can directly affect decision-making, create district-based systems aggregating multiple neighbourhood perspectives, and strengthen support services through federations. Journalist John Lorinc has proposed requiring associations to demonstrate demographic representativeness and governance transparency before municipalities engage them in formal consultation. The federal Housing Accelerator Fund has explicitly tied municipal funding to the removal of barriers to housing supply, including addressing NIMBYism.

== United Kingdom ==
In the United Kingdom, the equivalent organization is known as a residents' association (RA). Unlike their Canadian and American counterparts, British RAs are sometimes directly involved in electoral politics, contesting seats at local and county elections. In the 2024 United Kingdom local elections, Residents' Associations claimed 48 of the seats being contested across the 107 local councils that held elections.

== Spain ==
The first neighbourhood associations (Spanish: asociaciones de vecinos) in Spain were formed beginning in 1968, during the Franco dictatorship, under the 1964 Law on Associations of Heads of Household. The citizen movement played a leading role in the political, urban, social, and cultural transformations of late 20th-century Spain, and no analysis of that period can overlook the contribution of neighbourhood-level organizing.

== Asia ==
While neighbourhood associations in the United States, Canada, and Europe generally operate as autonomous grassroots organizations, some Asian models demonstrate a different relationship between local civic groups and the state. Political scientist Benjamin Read has referred to these organizations as "straddlers" for their spanning of the divide between state and civil society.

Read and other scholars identify four general frameworks for understanding how neighbourhood-based organizations relate to the state:

- Civil society theory: Local citizens' groups are autonomous from government.
- Mass organizations: The ruling party exercises ultimate control, dominating specific sectors of society.
- Corporatism: The state structures societal interests through formal channels.
- State-society synergy: Government and communities partner to enhance each other's efforts.

The relationship between state and neighbourhood organization can also be characterized by its level of statism. Mass organizations represent the most statist end, where associations are closely linked to the state, while the civil society model represents the least statist, where organizations are highly self-reliant. China, Singapore, Japan (see chonaikai), Taiwan, Indonesia, and Thailand provide examples of how these frameworks operate in practice.

== See also ==
- Afoča (Harar)
- Chōnaikai (Japan)
- Community association
- Community league
- Comparison of Home Owners' and Civic Associations
- Homeowner association
- Neighbourhood council
- Neighbourhood watch
- NIMBY
- YIMBY
