= Shamitu =

- Born: 1942; Harar
- Died: January 2002

Nuria Ahmed Shami Kalid (1942 – January 2002), nicknamed Shamitu, was a traditional Harari wāli (singer) and songwriter, the most famed and respected wāli during her life.

== Early life and career ==
Shamitu was born in 1942 in the Badro Bari neighborhood in Harar, Ethiopia. She lost her sight due to glaucoma at the age of seven. During her childhood she learned traditional Harari music while weaving baskets and attending weddings. As a teenager she decided to become a singer despite strong opposition from friends and family. (In some Muslim communities, women are discouraged or prohibited from singing in public.) For the next 45 years, Shamitu toured the world performing, often with her musical partner Amina Adam, nicknamed Gini. She travelled on UN sponsored trips in Africa, Europe, and Asia and performed at weddings, world music festivals, and for expatriate Harari communities worldwide.

== Personal life ==
Shamitu married at the age of seventeen and had four children.

== Death ==
Shamitu died in January 2002. Shortly before her passing, Shamitu expressed dismay that Harari traditional music was in decline.
