= Comprehensive planning =

Long-term large-area public policy developmental plan

San Diego, a comprehensive plan for its improvement, 1908

A City Plan for Austin, Texas, 1928

Comprehensive planning is an ordered process that determines community goals and aspirations in terms of community development. The end product is called a comprehensive plan, also known as a general plan, or master plan. This resulting document expresses and regulates public policies on transportation, utilities, land use, recreation, and housing. Comprehensive plans typically encompass large geographical areas, a broad range of topics, and cover a long-term time horizon. The term comprehensive plan is most often used by urban planners in the United States.

Each city and county adopts and updates their plan to guide the growth and land development of their community, for both the current period and the long term. This "serious document" is then the foundation for establishing goals, purposes, zoning and activities allowed on each land parcel to provide compatibility and continuity to the entire region as well as each individual neighborhood. It has been one of the most important instruments in city and regional planning since the early twentieth century.

== History ==
During the earliest times of American history, cities had little power given to them by State governments to control land use. After the American Revolution, the focus on property rights turned to self-rule and personal freedom, as this was a time of very strong personal property rights. Local governments had simple powers which included maintaining law and order and providing basic services. Cities had little power, if any at all, to direct development in the city.

Cities began to focus on the provision of basic services during the 1840s at a time known as the Sanitary Reform Movement. During this time, it became clear that there was a strong relationship between disease and the presence of an effective sewer system. Part of the movement included the development of sanitary survey planning to help bring sewer systems to disease-prone areas. From this planning also developed a new consciousness of townsite location. People began to understand the environmental and social impacts of building cities and developed ways in which to further lower the spread of deadly diseases. Frederick Law Olmsted was a firm believer in the relationship between the physical environment and sanitation, which helped lead to the development of grand parks and open spaces in communities to bring not only recreation, but sanitation as well. The Sanitary Reform Movement is seen by many as the first attempt at comprehensive planning, however it failed to be completely comprehensive because it focused on only one aspect of the city and did not consider the city as a whole.

During the nineteenth and twentieth centuries, cities began to urbanize at very high rates. Cities became very dense and full of disease. As a response to the overpopulation and chaotic conditions, planning became a major focus of many large American cities. The City Beautiful movement was one of the many responses to the decaying city. The movement began in Chicago in 1890 with the World's Columbian Exposition of 1893 and lasted until about the 1920s. The focus on the movement was the design and architectural characteristics of the city. Leaders of the movement wanted to push the vision of the ideal city, and demonstrate to the world what cities could look like if they were created to be works of art. The White City was created for the exposition which embodied the visions of the movement with neoclassical designed buildings set against landscaped streets. Visitors to the exhibition began to realize that cities could be much more than dirty, overcrowded places. The movement spread across the United States and influenced many major American cities.

In 1898, Ebenezer Howard published his book entitled "Tomorrow, a Peaceful Path to Reform," in which he developed the idea of a Garden City. This city was a planned development which included different land uses and community services. The communities were to be surrounded by a green belt and included many open spaces and parks within the city. These cities were designed to be completely self-sufficient and focused on decreasing the negative impacts traditional cities had on people's lives. Although these cities were considered to be utopian ideas, two cities were eventually built in this vision, Letchworth and Welwyn, England. The vision of Ebenezer Howard greatly impacted the idea of city planning in the United States for decades and helped in the development of the idea that cities must be planning comprehensively for growth.

After the turn of the twentieth century, American cities began to see the need for local development and growth plans. Influential in this planning was Daniel Hudson Burnham who re-created the city plan for Washington, D.C. created by Pierre Charles L'Enfant in 1791. The original plan called for grid iron laid streets crossed by diagonal boulevards, squares, plazas, parks, monuments, and sculptures. Over time this plan was largely ignored and the city had developed against L'Enfant's vision. Burnham was instrumental in recreating the city plan and helping to return the city to its once intended form. In 1903, Burnham helped create the city growth plan for the city of Cleveland, Ohio and in 1906 he created the city plan for San Francisco, California. Although these were all city development plans, it was not until 1909 when Burnham created the city plan for Chicago that his plans were comprehensive. The plan of Chicago is known today as the first comprehensive plan and it began a movement of comprehensive planning that emphasized planning as a way to not only make cities more beautiful, but to function better as well.

== Purpose ==
A comprehensive plan has significant benefits for a whole community as it helps to identify, define and protect important existing resources while also providing a blueprint for future growth that ensures equity and resilience for all stakeholders. Such a plan provides for common goals and community consensus as opposed to "spot zoning". A comprehensive plan may address but is not limited to the following considerations

- Existing and proposed land uses, and their intensity
- Impact on neighborhood character
- Equity
- Resilience and/or sustainability
- Protection of historical resources, cultural resources, natural resources, coastal resources and sensitive environmental areas (and agricultural resources if applicable)
- Population, demographic and socioeconomic trends
- Traffic and public transportation
- Utilities and infrastructure
- Housing resources and needs
- Economic development and tourism

== Comprehensive planning process ==
Comprehensive Planning typically follows a process that may consist of, but is not limited to a certain number of steps and assessments. By following this process, planners are able to determine a wide range of interconnecting issues that affect an urban area. Each step can be seen as interdependent and many times planners will revise the order to best fit their needs and wants.

=== Identifying issues ===
The planner must first address the issue they are investigating. "To be relevant, the planning process must identify and address not only contemporary issues of concern to residents, workers, property owners, and business people, but also the emerging issues that will be important in the future." Generally, planners determine community issues by involving various community leaders, community organizations, and ordinary citizens.

=== Stating goals ===
Once issues have been identified by a community, goals can then be established. Goals are community visions. They establish priorities for communities and help community leaders make future decisions which will affect the city. Stating goals is not always an easy process and it requires the active participation of all people in the community.

=== Collecting data ===
Data is needed in the planning process in order to evaluate current city conditions as well as to predict future conditions. Data is most easily collected from the United States Census Bureau, however many communities actively collect their own data. The most typical data collected for a comprehensive plan includes data about the environment, traffic conditions, economic conditions, social conditions (such as population and income), public services and utilities, and land use conditions (such as housing and zoning). Once this data is collected it is analyzed and studied. Outcomes of the data collection process include population projections, economic condition forecasts, and future housing needs.

=== Preparing the plan ===
The plan is prepared using the information gathered during the data collection and goal setting stages. A typical comprehensive plan begins by giving a brief background of the current and future conditions found in the data collection step. Following the background information are the community goals and the plans that will be used in order to implement those goals into the community. Plans may also contain separate sections for important issues such as transportation or housing which follow the same standard format.

=== Creating implementation plans ===
During this stage of the process different programs are thought of in order to implement the goals of the plan. These plans focus on issues such as cost and effectiveness. It is possible that a variety of plans will result from this process in order to realize one goal. These different plans are known as alternatives.

=== Evaluating alternatives ===
Each alternative should be evaluated by community leaders to ensure the most efficient and cost-effective way to realize the community's goals. During this stage each alternative should be weighed given its potential positive and negative effects, impacts on the community, and impacts on the city government. One alternative should be chosen that best meets the needs and desires of the community and community leaders for meeting the community goals.

=== Adopting a plan ===
The community needs to adopt the plan as an official statement of policy in order for it to take effect. This is usually done by the City Council and through public hearings. The City Council may choose not to adopt the plan, which would require planners to refine the work they did during previous steps. Once the plan is accepted by city officials it is then a legal statement of community policy in regard to future development.

=== Implementing and monitoring the plan ===
Using the implementation plans defined in the earlier stages, the city will carry out the goals in the comprehensive plan. City planning staff monitor the outcomes of the plan and may propose future changes if the results are not desired.

A comprehensive plan is not a permanent document. It can be changed and rewritten over time. For many fast growing communities, it is necessary to revise or update the comprehensive plan every five to ten years. In order for the comprehensive plan to be relevant to the community it must remain current.

== Legal basis ==
The basis for comprehensive planning comes from the government's duty and right to protect the health and welfare of its citizens. The power for local governments to plan generally comes from state planning enabling legislation; however, local governments in most states are not required by law to engage in comprehensive planning. State statutes usually provide the legal framework necessary for those communities choosing to participate while allowing others to disengage themselves from the process. The legal provision for comprehensive planning comes from what is called the Standard State Zoning Enabling Act which was written by the United States Department of Commerce in the 1920s. This act was never passed by the United States Congress but was rather a law written for state legislatures to willingly adopt. Many states did choose to adopt the act which provided local governments with the framework to engage in land use planning. Because the act never gave a clear definition for comprehensive planning, the Department of Commerce wrote another act, the Standard City Planning Enabling Act of 1928, which defined more precisely what a comprehensive plan is and how it should be used.

In states that do not require local governments to plan comprehensively, state governments usually provide many incentives to encourage the process at the local level. In Georgia, for example, the state government gives many incentives to local governments to establish comprehensive plans to guide development. Today, almost every county in Georgia has established a plan voluntarily.

However, a comprehensive plan is not usually legally binding. A community's ordinances must be amended in order to legally implement the provisions required to execute the comprehensive plan.

== By country ==
=== Italy ===
In Italy, urban planning was first introduced in 1865, by a specific parliament ordinary law (repealed in 2001), which was deeply modified during the fascist regime by another law in 1942 (still into force), which, amongst many emendaments, has introduced zoning. The most important part of urban planning is called Piano Regolatore Generale Comunale (general regulation town plan). Since the beginning of the new century, some regions have adopted specific variations, the most prominent case of which, the Piano di governo del territorio (government territory plan), often know by the acronym PGT, enforce in Lombardy region. Generally, it has three main parts: Piano Strutturale Comunale (structural town plan), Piano Operativo Comunale (operative town plan), Regolamento Urbanistico Edilizio (urban regulation for building construction).

=== United Kingdom ===
In the UK, the master plan and land-use planning is regulated by the Town and Country Planning Act 1990 and, for Scotland, the specific Town and Country Planning (Scotland) Act 1997.

=== United States ===
In California the General Plan (also known as a comprehensive plan in other states) is a document providing a long-range plan for a city’s physical development. Local jurisdictions have freedom as to what their general plans include, however there are certain requirements under California state law that each general plan must meet; failure to do so could result in suspension of future development. Each general plan must include the vision, goals, and objectives of the city or county in terms of planning and development within eight different “elements” defined by the state as: land use, housing, circulation, conservation, noise, safety, open space, and environmental justice (added as an official element in 2016).

==== Green General Plans ====
Local governments are continually implementing green measures into their general plans to promote community-wide sustainable practices. Introducing green elements and environmental resource elements can help local governments reach goals by lowering greenhouse gas emissions, reducing waste, improving energy and water efficiency and complying with state and nationwide standards such as California’s Global Warming Solutions Act of 2006.

=== Canada ===
In Canada, comprehensive planning is generally known as strategic planning or visioning. It is usually accompanied by public consultation. When cities and municipalities engage in comprehensive planning the resulting document is known as an Official Community Plan or OCP for short. (In Alberta, the resultant document is referred to as a Municipal Development Plan.

=== Iran ===
The city council of Isfahan, Iran, has a strategy council, which has developed its final program.

== See also ==
- City-building game – Video game genre
- Development plan
- Traffic
- Urban planning; also covers rural planning
- Urbanization
- Zoning
