= Bashe Awil Omar =

Somaliland diplomat and politician

Bashe Awil Haji Omar
- In office 2018–2021

Somaliland Representative to Kenya
- In office 2015–2018

Personal details
- Born: 1972 (age 53–54) Hargeisa, Somaliland
- Occupation: Diplomat

Bashe Awil Haji Omar (born 1972 in Hargeisa, Somaliland) is a diplomat and politician. He served as the Somaliland Representative to the United Arab Emirates (2015-2018) and Kenya (2018-2021) as President of the Somaliland Liaison Office.

== Background ==
Omar was born in 1972 in Hargeisa, Somaliland, and belongs to the Imran clan of the wider Isaaq clan-family.

In 1991, following the outbreak of the Somali Civil War, he moved to the United Kingdom. In 1997, Omar graduated with a bachelor's degree in chemistry from University College London. Omar received a scholarship to attend University of Manchester where he graduated with an MSc in Petrochemistry and Hydrocarbons Chemistry.

During his residence in California, he got involved with mobilization for Kulmiye, a political party founded by his father-in-law, Ahmed Mohamed Mohamoud. in 2011, Omar and his family moved to Nairobi, Kenya. On 30 June 2015, Omar was appointed as the new Ambassador of Somaliland to the United Arab Emirates where he served from 2015 to 2018. In 2018, President Musa Bihi Abdi appointed Omar as Somaliland Representative to Kenya and President of the Somaliland Liaison Office in Nairobi.

Upon assumption of the office in Nairobi, Omar has organised two major conferences between Somaliland and Kenya focusing on infrastructure and energy in 2018 and 2019.
