= Ishaaq bin Ahmed =

Hashemite forefather of the Isaaq clan

Sheikh Ishaq Sheekh Isxaaq
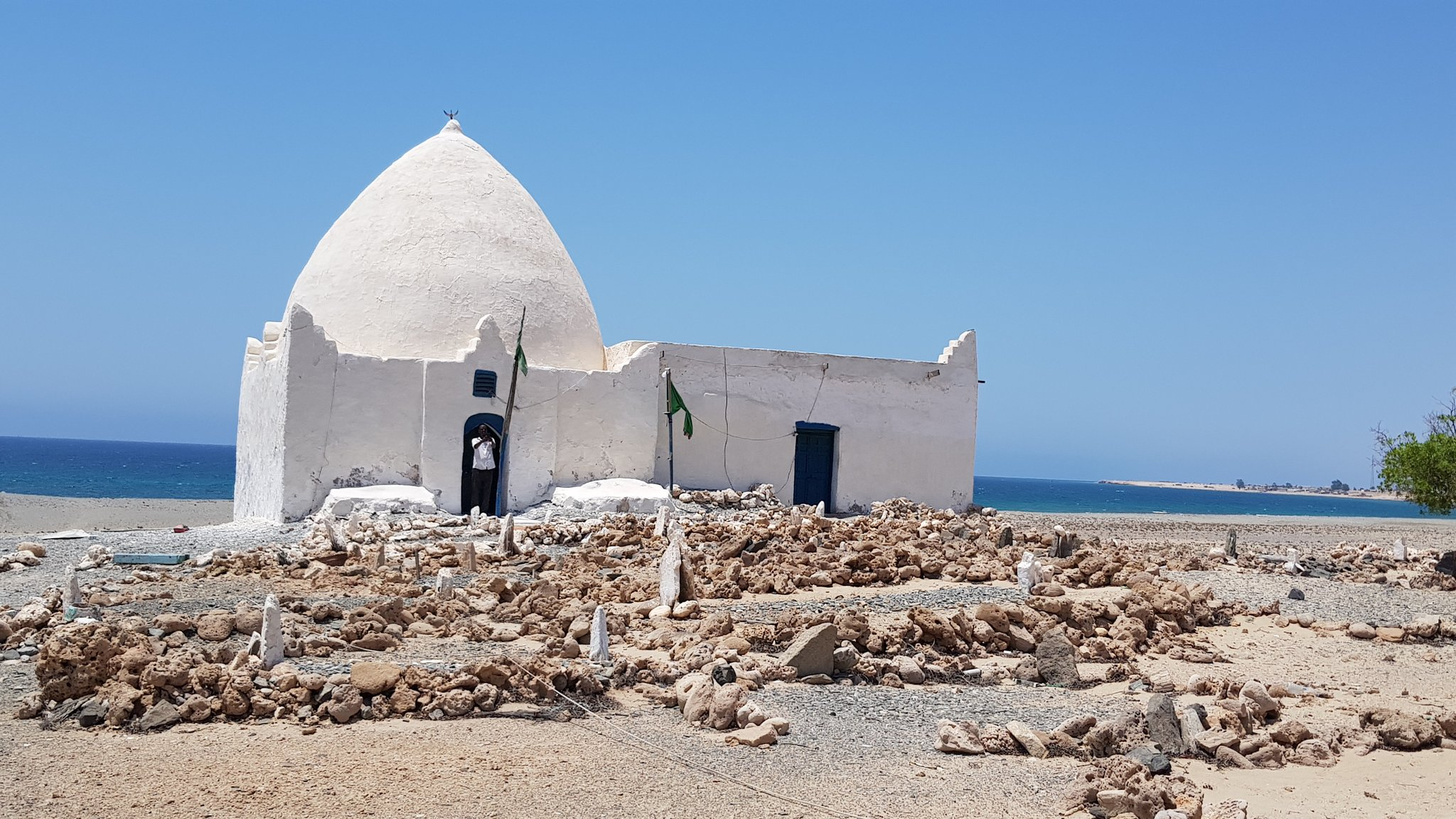
- Tomb of Sheikh Ishaaq in Maydh, Sanaag, Somaliland

Personal life
- Born: 11th century, Medina, modern-day Saudi Arabia.
- Died: 12th century Maydh, modern-day Somaliland
- Children: Ahmed (Tolje'lo); Musa (Habr Je'lo); Muhammad ('Ibran); Ibrahim (Sanbuur); Abd al-Rahman (Awal); Muhammad (Arap); Ayub; Isma'il (Garhajis)
- Parents: Ahmed bin Muhammad (father); Shariffa A’atika Bintu Ali Bin Muhmmad (mother)
- Main interest(s): Islamic literature, Islamic philosophy
- Known for: Mythical eponymous ancestor of Isaaq
- Other names: Ash-Shaykh Ishaaq, Ash-Shaykh al Muhajir

Religious life
- Religion: Islam

Ishaaq bin Ahmad bin Muhammad, more commonly known as Sheikh Ishaaq or Sheikh Isaaq (Somali: Sheekh Isxaaq) is a semi-legendary figure who plays a prominent role in the oral traditions of the Somali Isaaq clan-family. According to these traditions, which were also preserved in several Arabic hagiologies, he was an Islamic scholar of the Shafi’i school who crossed the sea from Arabia to the Horn of Africa. He is traditionally regarded as the Sayyid forefather of the Isaaq clan-family, whose territory in the Horn of Africa is wide and densely populated.

According to tradition, Sheikh Ishaaq traveled from Arabia to Somaliland in the 10th or 11th century, where he married two women; one from the local Dir clan and the other from the neighbouring Harari people. He sired eight sons who are the common ancestors of the Isaaq clan-family. He is said to have settled in what is today the Erigavo District, and to have established his capital at Maydh. He remained in Maydh until his death.

The stories surrounding Sheikh Ishaaq have played an important role in establishing and reinforcing the Arab and Muslim identity of the Isaaq clan. Scholar Christopher Ehret considers the founders of Somali clans like the Isaaq and the Darod to have been historical figures, but he regards the accounts surrounding them as legends. While Sada Mire regards the foundation of Somali clan lineages by Arab progenitors as part of "the Somali Islamic myth of origin", she does relate the legendary accounts surrounding them to historical migrations from South Arabia to Somalia.

== Biography ==
As a figure known only from oral tradition and hagiological accounts, Ishaaq bin Ahmed's historicity is unclear, and there are varying views on the validity of the narratives about him. Christopher Ehret considers the founders of Somali clans like the Isaaq or the Darod to have been historical figures, but regards the accounts surrounding them as legends. Mohamed Haji Mukhtar expresses skepticism that the population of two of the largest Somali clans (Isaaq and Darod) could descend from two Arab individuals (Ishaaq bin Ahmed and Abdirahman bin Isma'il al-Jabarti, respectively). The pan-Islamic scholar Sharif Aydarus considers the accounts to be largely historical.

=== Early life ===
According to tradition, after the death of Sheikh Ishaaq's grandfather he went on a series of migrations in order to study further and preach Islam. He first preached in Mecca and then travelled to Egypt, and hence to Eritrea and Zeila. He then later settled in the area of Saba' in modern-day Yemen where he married the sister of the king of the Al Haqar clan. Sheikh Ishaaq later settled in the Al-Jawf region in northern Yemen where he married once again and had a son, Mansur, who is the forefather of the Al Mansur clan in the Al-Jawf region. He then travelled to Yaba where he married and had a son, Yusuf, who is the forefather of the Al Yusuf clan based in Yaba and Ma'rib regions.

=== Migrations ===
Traditional Arabic hagiologies of the Isaaq clan describe how Sheikh Isaaq first made a series of travels through Arabia, before sailing to the ancient Somali port of Zeila and continuing his travels through Somaliland and some regions of Ethiopia, finally settling in Maydh.

While scholar Ioan Lewis considers these travel accounts to be a foundation myth, he does acknowledge that they likely reflect a historical settlement of Arabs in Somaliland. Scholar Sada Mire also regards the narratives surrounding the founders of Somali clan lineages like Ishaaq bin Ahmed to be part of origin myths. In her view, these origin myths are meant to establish, through the link created between modern Somali clans and early Islamic figures like the prophet Muhammad or Ali ibn Abi Talib, a notion of 'divine kinship'. Nevertheless, Mire also notes that while the Somali clan members she interviewed stated that Ishaaq bin Ahmed arrived in Somalia about 850 years ago, historical records do indicate that migrations from Hadhramaut and other parts of South Arabia to Somalia took place c. 1250.

=== Arrival in the Horn of Africa ===
In accordance with tradition, Sheikh Ishaaq then continued his journey and migrated to Zeila, Somaliland and finally Harar in Ethiopia. Several accounts indicate Shaykh Yusuf al Kownayn and Sheikh Isaaq were known to be contemporaries in Zeila and in contact at the same time. According to a popular legend, Shaykh Yusuf al Kownayn, known locally as Aw-Barkhadle, upon meeting Sheikh Ishaaq prophesied that Sheikh Ishaaq would be blessed by Allah with many children while Shaykh Yusuf would not have descendants. According to the prophecy the descendants of Sheikh Ishaaq would also visit Aw-Barkhadle's grave and pay respect and perform siyaaro, or pilgrimage to his tomb. Saints and Somalis: popular Islam in a clan-based society states:

Since, however, Aw Barkhadle’s precise connection with the rulers of Ifat is not widely known, he appears as an isolated figure, and in comparison with the million or so spears of the Isaaq lineage, a saint deprived of known issue. The striking difference between these two saints is explained in a popular legend, according to which, when Sheikh Isaaq and Aw Barkhadle met, the latter prophesied that Isaaq would be blessed by God with many children. He, however, would not have descendants, but Isaaq’s issue would pay him respect and siyaaro (voluntary offerings). So it is, one is told, that every year the Isaaq clansmen gather at Aw Barkhadle’s shrine to make offerings in his name.

According to tradition, after studying and proselytizing in Harar he then undertook the pilgrimage to Makkah, came back to Somaliland and went along the shore eastward to the coastal town of Maydh in eastern Somaliland, where he converted the pagan peoples to Islam. He later settled in the town aged 60, where he married two women; one of the Magaadle Dir clan called Magaado, and a Harari woman called Hanifa, the daughter of a Harari emir, with descendants belonging to the Habar Magaadle or Habar Habusheed branches respectively. He sired eight sons who are the common ancestors of the subclans of the Isaaq ethnic group. He remained in Maydh until his death.

== Lineage and descendants ==
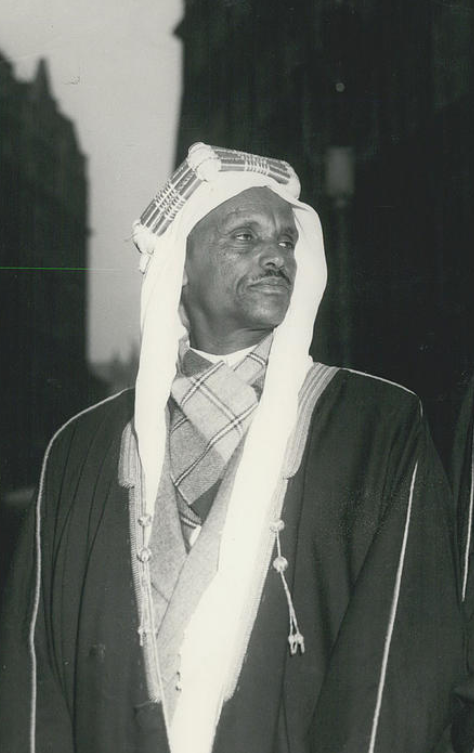
Sultan Abdurahman Deria of the Habr Awal Isaaq in London 1955

Arabic hagiologies trace Ishaaq bin Ahmed's lineage to Ali bin Abi Talib, the cousin and son-in-law of the Islamic prophet Muhammad. Scholar Ioan Lewis considers that, given the preponderance of names belonging to early Islamic Arabia rather than to medieval Somali-Arab culture, this lineage is unlikely to be genuine. According to Lewis, the genealogy is 'Arabicized' with the goal of enhancing the prestige of the Isaaq among the many ethnic groups in modern and contemporary Somalia. Scholar Sada Mire regards the creation of lineages like this as part of what she terms "the Somali Islamic myth of origin". The pan-Islamic scholar Sharif Aydarus considers the accounts to be largely historical, and agrees with the tradition of Ishaaq bin Ahmed's Arab origin.

The Isaaq ethnic group are divided into two uterine divisions, as shown in the genealogy below. The first division is between those lineages descended from sons of Sheikh Ishaaq by a Harari woman – the Habr Habusheed – and those descended from sons of Sheikh Ishaaq by a Somali woman of the Magaadle sub-clan of the Dir – the Habr Magaadle. Indeed, most of the largest clans of the Isaaq ethnic group are in fact uterine alliances; hence the matronymic "Habr" which in archaic Somali means "mother". This is illustrated in the following ethnic structure.

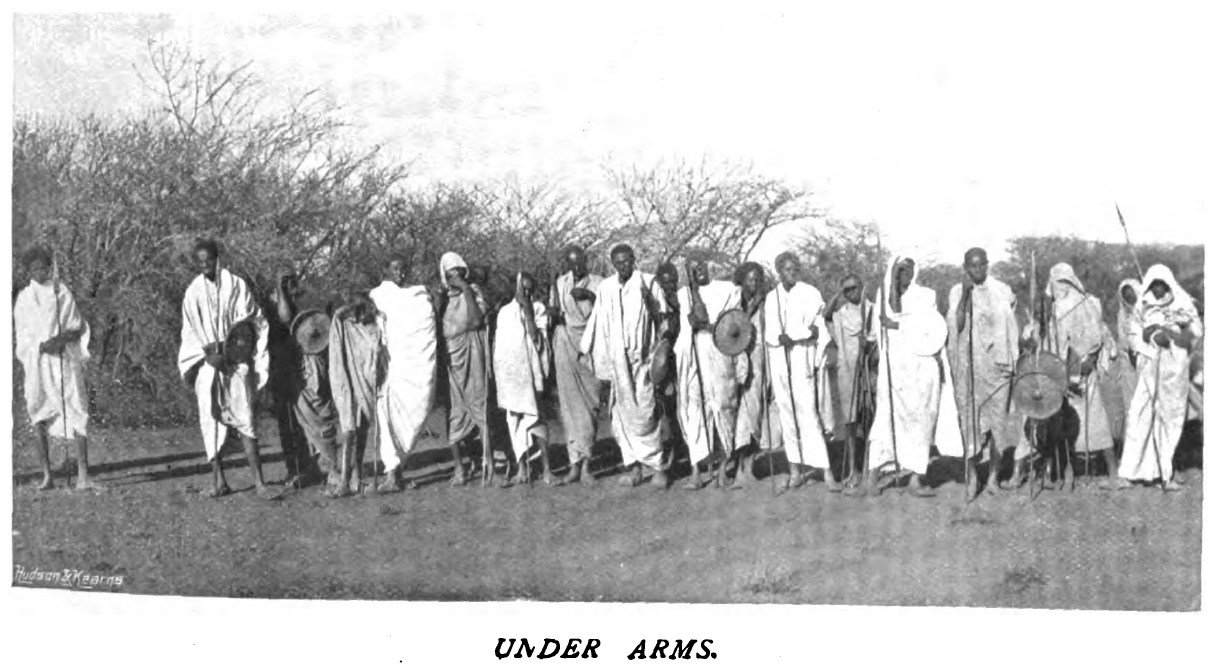
Warriors of the Habr Awal subclan

A. Habr Magaadle

- Ismail (Garhajis)
- Ayub
- Muhammad (Arap)
- Abdirahman (Habr Awal)

B. Habr Habuusheed

- Ahmed (Tol Je’lo)
- Muuse (Habr Je'lo)
- Ibrahiim (Sanbuur)
- Muhammad (‘Ibraan)

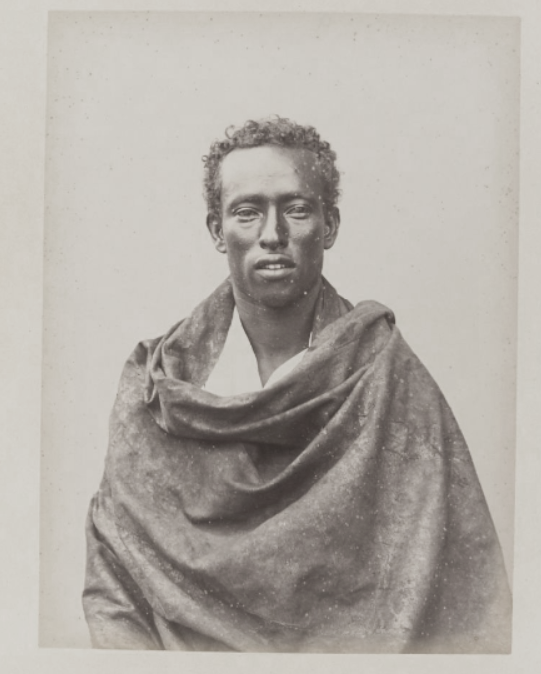
Dualeh Abdi of the Musa Abokor Habr Je'lo clan photographed in 1890

There is clear agreement on the clan and sub-clan structures that has not changed for a long time. The oldest recorded genealogy of a Somali in Western literature was by Sir Richard Burton in the mid–19th century regarding his Isaaq (Habr Yunis) host and the governor of Zeila, Sharmarke Ali Saleh.

The following listing is taken from the World Bank's Conflict in Somaliland: Drivers and Dynamics from 2005 and the United Kingdom's Home Office publication, Somaliland Assessment 2001.

- Isaaq
  - Habr Awal
    - Sacad Muuse
    - Issa Musse
  - Arap
  - Ayub
  - Garhajis
    - Habr Yunis
    - Eidagalle
  - Habr Je'lo
    - Muuse Abokor
    - Mohamed Abokor
    - Samane Abokor
  - Tol Je'lo
  - Sanbuur
  - Imraan

One tradition maintains that Sheikh Ishaaq had twin sons: Muhammad (Arap), and Ismail (Garhajis). In addition, Sheikh Ishaaq had four additional sons in Yemen (Dir'an, Shareef, Yusuf and Mansur) whose descendants inhabit parts of northern Yemen, including the Khawlan district and the Ma'rib governorate.

In one account, Sheikh Ishaaq's three eldest sons split their father's inheritance among themselves. Isma’il receives his imama, a symbol of leadership; Abdel-Rahman receives the sheikh's wealth; and Ahmad inherits his sword. The story is intended to depict the Garhajis' alleged proclivity for politics, the Habr Awal's mercantile prowess, and the Habr Je'lo's bellicosity.

To strengthen these tribal stereotypes, historical anecdotes have been used: The Habar Yonis allegedly dominated positions as interpreters for the British during the colonial period, and thus acquired pretensions to intellectual and political superiority; Habr Awal dominance of the trade via Djibouti and Berbera is practically uncontested; and Habr Je’lo military prowess is cited in accounts of previous conflicts.

== Legacy ==
There are a number of existing hagiologies in Arabic which describe Sheikh Ishaaq's travels, works and life in Somaliland, as well as his movements in Arabia before his arrival. Like other texts of this genre, they are strongly focused on narrating the holy man's pious deeds and the miracles he performed. Among these texts are:

- Manāqib al-shaykh Isḥāq (a text in the genre of manaqib or 'laudatory biography')
- Nubdha ('genealogical account'), written by Ādam ibn Waʿays
- Amjād ('praiseworthy qualities'), written by Ḥusayn ibn Aḥmad Darwīsh

Sheikh Ishaaq's descendants would later go on to form two powerful sultanates that dominated the northern coastline of the Horn of Africa during the early modern era; the Isaaq sultanate and the Habr Yunis sultanate.

=== Tomb ===
Sheikh Ishaaq's tomb is in Maydh, and is the scene of frequent pilgrimages. Sheikh Ishaaq's mawlid (birthday) is also celebrated every Thursday with a public reading of his manaaqib (a collection of glorious deeds). His siyaara or pilgrimage is performed annually both within Somaliland and in the diaspora particularly in the Middle East among Isaaq expatriates. The tomb was kept by the family of Somali artist Abdullahi Qarshe.

Murray in his book The Journal of the Royal Geographical Society notes that many men from the Isaaq clans would travel to Maydh to spend the last years of their lives in hopes of being buried near Sheikh Ishaaq. The book states:

The stranger is at once struck with the magnitude of the burial-ground at Meyet, which extends for fully a mile each way. Attachment to the memory of their forefather Isaakh yet induces many aged men of the western tribes to pass the close of their lives at Meyet, in order that their tombs may be found near that of their chief, and this will account for the unusual size of this cemetery. Many of the graves have head-stones of madrepore, on which is cut in relief the name of the tenant below, and of these many are to be found 250 years old.
