= Tonarigumi =

Unit of the Japanese World War II national mobilization program

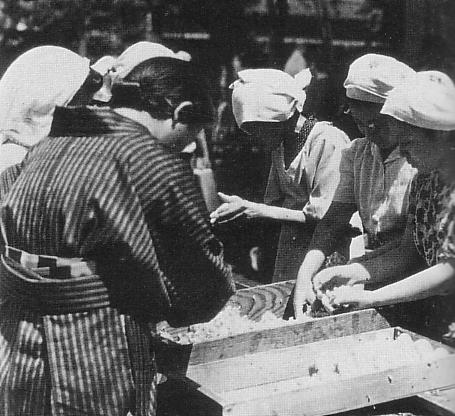
Emergency food distribution by tonarigumi housewives

The Neighborhood Association (隣組, Tonarigumi) was the smallest unit of the national mobilization program established by the Japanese government in World War II. It consisted of units consisting of 10-15 households organized for fire fighting, civil defense and internal security.

== History and development ==
Neighborhood mutual-aid associations existed in Japan since before the Edo period. The system was formalized on 11 September 1940 by order of the Home Ministry (Japan) under Imperial Rule Assistance Association by the cabinet of Prime Minister Fumimaro Konoe. Participation was mandatory. Each unit was responsible for allocating rationed goods, distributing government bonds, fire fighting, public health, and civil defense. Each unit was also responsible for assisting the National Spiritual Mobilization Movement by distribution of government propaganda and organizing participation in patriotic rallies.

The government also found the tonarigumi useful for the maintenance of public security. A network of informants was established linking every neighborhood association with the Tokkō Police to watch for infractions of national laws and suspect political or moral behavior.

Tonarigumi were also organized in territories occupied by Japan for the same purposes, including Manchukuo, Mengjiang, the Wang Jingwei Government, and later in occupied territories of Southeast Asia (such as the Indonesian RT/RW system).

Later in the Pacific War the tonarigumi received basic military training to serve as observers for enemy planes over cities or suspicious boats along the coasts. In the final stages of war the Imperial government intended the tonarigumi to form a secondary militia in the case of enemy invasion. Some tonarigumi took part in combat in Manchukuo, northern Chōsen and Karafuto in the closing days of the Pacific War.

Formally abolished in 1947 by the American occupation authorities, the system survives to a certain extent in the modern chonaikai, or jichikai which are nominally independent voluntary associations, but which retain a quasi-governmental status in that they have limited responsibility for local administration and coordination of activities such as neighborhood watch and disaster relief.

== See also ==
- Barangay
- Coastwatchers (Allied Forces)
- Great Japan Youth Party
- Rukun warga and rukun tetangga, modern administrative divisions of Indonesian descended from the tonarigumi
- Senjinkun military code
- Volunteer Fighting Corps
