= Qalloocan =

- Town
- Location in Somaliland Qalloocan (Somaliland)
- Coordinates: 8.537°N 45.759°E
- Country: Somaliland
- Region: Togdheer
- District: Burao District

Population (2006)
  - Total: 233
- Time zone: UTC+3 (EAT)

Qalloocan, also spelt Qaloocan is a town in the Burao District, in the Togdheer region of Somaliland. It is inhabited by the Sanbuur sub-division of the Habr Je'lo Isaaq clan.

== Demographics ==
In June 2006 Qalloocan had an estimated population of 233.
