= Nebila Abdulmelik =

Ethiopian women's rights activist and poet

- Born: 1987 (age 38–39); Addis Ababa, Ethiopia
- Education: UCLA
- Occupation: women's rights activist
- Known for: her #JusticeforLiz campaign

Nebila Abdulmelik is an Ethiopian feminist activist. She is known for spearheading the campaign #JusticeforLiz which was launched in order to seek justice for a 16 year old Kenyan girl called Liz who was raped in 2013. Nebila was manager of media relations at FEMNET, an institution that advocates for women's growth in Africa.

== Early life ==
Nebila was born in Addis Ababa, Ethiopia, the youngest out of three sisters. Her father died when she was 13. As a young Muslim woman of Harari origin, she says she suffered from discrimination, which influenced her in becoming an activist. She obtained a scholarship for higher studies in the United States, and graduated with an MA at the University of California, Los Angeles in African Studies.

== Career ==
Nebila pursued her career as an activist advocating for women's rights. She has travelled to over 40 countries and has worked with several human rights organisations. She worked with Pan-African women's rights organisations including FEMNET as well as the African Union through the African Governance Architecture Secretariat.

In 2013, she launched an online petition titled #JusticeforLiz following the gang rape of Liz and the petition garnered more than 2 million signatures demanding death sentence for the rapists. On October 7th, 2013 a sixteen year old Nigerian girl known by “Liz” story was reported for the first time in Kenyan national newspaper the Daily Nation.In June of 2013 Liz had been gang-raped by six men who had later throw her into a pit latrine and left her to die. Liz had survived her serious injuries and was able to report her situation to a local police station and she was able to name three of her attackers. The punishment the police officers had given Liz’s three attackers she was able to identify was to work in the garden and cut grass at the police station. Enraged by the injustice, Nebila fall asleep that night.This is when she created the online petition named #JusticeforLiz that was addressed to George Kimaiyo, which demanded the immediate arrest of the perpetrators, as well as disciplinary action to the police officer who dismally handled Liz’s case. The initial target for the petition was 1,000 signatures. They met that target in a span of two to three days and the number doubled. The petition had gained a lot more attention than expected which included a feature on BBC to talk about online activism. During the short radio interview Nebila had mentioned that although they had reached and surpassed the target goal it was still not enough. She stated that them petition needed to go viral and reach a million signatures which it later did.

In August 2021, she was listed as one of the seven African women activists who deserve a Wikipedia article by the Global Citizen, an international organisation and advocacy organisation.

== Creative Work ==
In 2009, Abdulmelik published a poem entitle Mother Africa in the journal named Ufahamu: A Journal of African Studies. Nebila is also one of the authors of the poem named You Have Reached the Women. Nebila is the author of a poem titled What’s in a Name?

In 2014, alongside hip-hop rapper Black Bird, they composed an African Day song called “One Afrika,” focusing on the positive elements of the rap genre. In 2017, alongside Peter Aling'o, they published a policy brief titled "From Rhetoric to Action: Delivering for Young Women in Africa," exploring the burden of gender and age discrimination faced by young African women. Her work explores sexual and reproductive health rights, gender equality and political participation.
