= Official community plan =

Canadian municipal development plan

In Canada, an official community plan is a comprehensive plan created by an incorporated municipality which dictates public policy in terms of transportation, utilities, land use, recreation, and housing. OCPs typically encompass large geographical areas, a broad range of topics, and cover a long-term time horizon. The process of creating an OCP is today often referred to as a Community Vision.

In the United States such a plan is known as a comprehensive plan.

In some large jurisdictions and metropolitan areas experiencing significant growth, regional transportation plans are made that work in conjunction with municipal OCPs.

Official community plans are the formal term for documents created by an incorporated municipality and filed with the provincial government, usually the Ministry of Municipal Affairs.

OCPs have to be periodically updated to remain relevant. For example, the City of North Vancouver created an Official Community Plan in 1980, 1992, and again in 2002. When objectives of the plan have been achieved new objectives are set. For example, the City of North Vancouver in Metro Vancouver states as its achievements the construction of 5,000 units of housing in the city center, commercial and institutional development, a balanced mix of transportation modes, modern telecommunications infrastructure, a high percentage of multifamily housing, an accessible waterfront, and a balance between jobs and labour force.

Community planning may also be done on a smaller scale. The resulting plan is not an official community plan but is known as a neighborhood plan. In Vancouver such Neighborhood Plans are also known as community visions. The primary motive for these neighborhood plans in Vancouver was to find ways to accommodate more housing (or new housing choices) in existing neighborhoods in a way sensitive and responsive to the concerns of existing residents. The official statement being more vague:

"THAT Council and Departments use the ... Community vision directions to help guide policy decisions, corporate work, priorities, budgets and capital plans in this community."
