= Chōnaikai =

A chōnaikai (町内会) is a Japanese local community of citizens or a form of neighborhood association.

== History ==
Before the Meiji Restoration, more than 70,000 municipalities in Japan were small entities. The new centralized government viewed them as potential areas of unrest. Two waves of municipal mergers intended to weaken those entities. This resulted in chōnaikai, informal associations taking the place of former village or neighbourhood communities.

During World War II, these associations were involved in many points:

- Civil defense against bombing and ensuing fires
- Maintenance of roads and public buildings
- Supply of food and first aid gear

During the Occupation of Japan, the American provisional government forbade them. They were allowed only after the Treaty of San Francisco in 1951.

Nowadays, the chōnaikai are put forward again and are gathered in a nationwide chōnaikai federation (町内会連合会, chōnaikai rengōkai).

== Characteristics ==
A chōnaikai deals with five criteria:

=== Territory ===
The local government generally covers the same area. According to the evolution of the population, the chōnaikai may be divided.

=== Membership ===
The household is the basic member. Some sections may exist for women, children or elderly, taking part in the proper activities. Sometimes, a corporate membership is also allowed for financial issues.

=== Automatic membership ===
For a new household, membership is not mandatory, but gives access to a lot of facilities. Non-member households are somewhat ostracized from the community and are treated as strangers {{}}. People in rented rooms, typically students or young salary men, are said to be member of the household of the landowner. Because apartment tenants reside in the community temporarily, and the associations are geared toward homeowners and families, they are under no social pressure to join.

=== Activities ===
They attend a wide range:

- Security of the neighbourhood, especially during natural disasters
- Waste management,
- Aid to the elderly and disabled
- Cultural and sport activities, aiming at a better mutual understanding
- Funeral activities
  - When a member of the community dies, association members assist the bereaved family with funeral arrangements
- Assistance in case of a disaster
  - When a house is destroyed by fire or other means, association members provide the homeless family with shelter, food, clothing, and monetary donations to assist the family in replacing their home and other lost possessions.
  - When a disaster hits a region, associations in neighboring communities participate in assistance efforts.

=== Kairanban (かいらんばん,回覧板) ===
A Kairanban is tool sometimes used by Chonaikai as part of "circular notice" systems. The kairanban is typically a folder or clipboard that is used to pass information from household to household. A log is kept inside the kairanban that residents sign to indicate they have reviewed the material before passing it to the next household.

=== Institutional part ===
Based in the same general area, the chōnaikai improves the municipality. It subsidizes modes of communication and can encourage local participation. But it can also exert influence in political issues, mobilizing the neighbourhood with petitions or demonstrations.

== See also ==
- Tonarigumi
