= Ibran =

Somali clan

Cibraan, Cimraan

Regions with significant populations

Languages
- Somali

Religion
- Sunni Islam

Related ethnic groups
- Habr Je'lo, Habr Awal, Arap, Garhajis, and other Isaaq groups

The Ibran (Somali: Cibraan or Cimraan) is a major clan of the wider Isaaq clan family. Ibran had three sons, Egale, Abdalle and Essa. Egale- cali qaar, cumar adan and reer ahmed. Abdalle - reer xaga, reer xarbi,and reer abdalle , Essa . Its members form part of the larger Habr Je'lo confederation along with the Muse Sheikh Ishaaq, Sanbuur and Tol Je'lo clans. Politically however, the Ibran are part of the Habr Je'lo.

The clan primarily inhabits the Togdheer region of Somaliland, ( war imran district is their largest city and burco,gaatama,gaadleyaal,higlo and beer ) as well as the Somali Region in Ethiopia.

== History ==
Sheikh Ishaaq ibn Ahmed is a legendary mythical figure who purportedly arrived in the Horn of Africa to spread Islam around 12th to 13th century. He is said to have been descended from Prophet Mohammed's daughter Fatimah. Hence the Sheikh belonged to the Ashraf or Sada, titles given to the descendants of the prophet. He married two local women in Somaliland that left him eight sons, one of them being Muhammad (Imran). The descendants of those eight sons constitute the Isaaq clan-family.

== Distribution ==
The Ibran primarily reside in Togdheer region in Somaliland, as well as the Somali Region in Ethiopia. They also have a large settlement in Kenya where they are known as a constituent segment of the Isahakia community.

== Notable figures ==
- Bashe Awil Omar - former Deputy Foreign Minister of Somaliland and former Somaliland ambassador to Kenya and the United Arab Emirates.
- Ibrahim Ismail Sugulle (Sooraan) - poet, comedian and composer.
- Yusuf Noor Budhle - Businessman and writer
- Jama Warsame Haid - Deputy leader of KAAH party Somaliland and politician
