= Sanbur =

Somali clan

Sanbuur صنبور

Languages
- Somali, Arabic

Religion
- Islam (Sunni)

Related ethnic groups
- Habr Je'lo, Habr Awal, Arap, Garhajis, and other Isaaq groups

The Sanbur (Somali: Sanbuur, Arabic: صنبور, Full Name: Ibrāhīm ibn ash-Shaykh Isḥāq ibn Aḥmad) is a major clan of the wider Isaaq clan family. Its members form part of the larger Habr Habusheed confederation along with the Habr Je'lo, Ibran and Tol Je'lo clans. Politically however, the Sanbur fall under the Habr Je'lo clan.

The clan primarily inhabits the Togdheer and Sanaag regions of Somaliland, especially the towns of Qallocan and Ruguuda.

== History ==
=== Lineage ===
Sheikh Ishaaq ibn Ahmed was one of the Arabian scholars that crossed the sea from Arabia to the Horn of Africa to spread Islam around 12th to 13th century. He is said to have been descended from Prophet Mohammed's daughter Fatimah. Hence the Sheikh belonged to the Ashraf or Sada, titles given to the descendants of the prophet. He married two local women in Somaliland that left him eight sons, one of them being Ibrahim (Sanbur). The descendants of those eight sons constitute the Isaaq clan-family.

=== Trading ===
The Sanbur have a long history of trading and are known as a wealthy clan by other Somalis. The Sanbur-inhabited port town of Ruguuda was a well known landmark to navigators and legendary Arab explorer Ahmad ibn Mājid wrote of Ruguda and a few other many notable landmarks and ports of the northern Somali coast, including Berbera, the Sa'ad ad-Din islands aka the Zeila Archipelago near Zeila, Siyara, Maydh, Alula, El-Sheikh, Heis and El-Darad.

John Hanning Speke, an English explorer who made an exploratory expedition to the area in an attempt to reach the Nugaal Valley, described the port town:

On the 21st October, 1854, Lieutenant Speke, from the effects of a stiff easterly wind and a heavy sea, made by mistake the harbour of Rakudah. This place has been occupied by the Rer Dud, descendants of Sambur, son of Ishak. It is said to consist of an small fort, and two or three huts of matting, lately re-erected. About two years ago the settlement was laid waste by the rightful owners of the soil, the Musa Abokr, a sub-family of the Habr Tal Jailah.

— Sir Richard Francis Burton, First Footsteps in East Africa, Or, An Exploration of Harar

== Distribution ==
The Sanbur primarily reside in Togdheer and Sanaag regions in Somaliland, especially the towns of Qalloocan and Ruguuda. They also have a large settlement in Kenya where they are known as a constituent segment of the Isahakia community.

== Notable people ==
- Abdirashid Duale – a British-Somali entrepreneur and the CEO of Dahabshiil, an international funds transfer company
- Muse Haji Abdi Duale - Speaker of the House of Elders of Somaliland
